In September 1939, the British Army was in process of expanding their anti-aircraft and mobile (including armoured) assets. Among these new changes was the formation of Anti-Aircraft Command which was formed on 1 April 1939, and the 1st Armoured Division formed in 1937. The list below will include the British Army units, colonial units, and those units which were in the process of formation.

The list includes units which were in the process of formation, cadre sized, or had no units attached  Also included are Territorial Army (TA) and Supplementary Reserve (SR) units.

War Office 
The War Office or WO as it was abbreviated, was the office of the British Government which controlled all of the Armed Forces of which were based around the United Kingdom of Great Britain & Northern Ireland and Middle East.

 Secretary of State for War, The Right Honourable Leslie Hore-Belisha, MP (holding the office from 28 May 1937 – 5 January 1940)
Army Council, Secretary of State for War held the office of President of the Army Council, this council was made up of 7 other members
 Department of the Parliamentary Under-Secretary of State for War
 Department of the Permanent Under-Secretary of State for War
 Department of the Financial Secretary of the War Office
 Department of the Director-General of the Territorial Army
 Military Attaches to Embassies Legations to Foreign Courts
 British Military Mission to the Egyptian Army
 British Military Mission to the Iraq Army
 Department of the Chief-of-Staff of the Imperial General Staff
 Department of the Quartermaster General to the Forces
 Department of the Adjutant General to the Forces
 Office of the Judge Advocate General to the Forces
 Selection Board
 Officer Training Corps
 Inspectors-General
 Elements of the Department of the Director General of Munitions Production, had been transferred to the Ministry of Supply on 1 August 1939.

Northern Command 
Northern Command
Headquartered at York, covering the areas of: Berwick-upon-Tweed (except regulars), Northumberland, County Durham, Yorkshire, Lincolnshire, Rutlandshire, Leicestershire, Nottinghamshire, and Derbyshire.

 General Officer Commanding-in-Chief, Northern Command: General Sir William 'Barty' Henry Bartholomew
 Northern Command Pay Section, Royal Army Pay Corps, Imphal Barracks
 Air Formation Signals, Royal Corps of Signals (SR), Leeds
 1st (West Riding) Signal Company, Royal Corps of Signals, Leeds
 3rd (West Riding) Signal Company, Royal Corps of Signals, Leeds
 5th Signal Company, Royal Corps of Signals, Bradford
 Northern Command Signal Company, Royal Corps of Signals, York
 4th Artillery Signal Section, Royal Corps of Signals, Catterick Camp
 7th Tank Signal Section, Royal Corps of Signals, Catterick Camp
Signals Training Centre, Royal Corps of Signals, Catterick Camp
 Training Battalion, Royal Corps of Signals, Catterick Camp
1st Battalion, Alexandra, Princess of Wales's Own North Yorkshire Regiment (The Green Howards), Catterick Camp (attached to 13th Inf Bde for Admin)
Royal Irish Fusiliers Depot, Catterick Camp (temporary)
Railway Operating Group, Royal Engineers (SR), Leeds
153rd (London and North Eastern) Railway Operating Company, Royal Engineers, Cambridge
155th (London, Midland, and Scottish) Railway Workshop, Royal Engineers, Derby
 1st Docks Group, Royal Engineers (SR), York
 2nd Docks Group, Royal Engineers (SR), Crewe
 106th (West Riding) Army Troop Company, Royal Engineers (SR), Doncaster
 107th (North Riding) Army Troops Company, Royal Engineers (SR), Middlesbrough
 150th (London and North Eastern) Railway Construction, Royal Engineers (SR), Cambridge
15th Company, Royal Army Service Corps, Imphal Barracks
28th Company, Royal Army Service Corps, Catterick Camp
H Company, Royal Army Service Corps, Catterick Camp
 9th Section, Royal Army Ordnance Corps, Catterick Camp
 13th Section, Royal Army Ordnance Corps, Chetwynd Barracks
 8th Company, Royal Army Medical Corps, York
Detachment, Royal Army Veterinary Corps, Catterick Camp
Detachment, Royal Army Veterinary Corps, Imphal Barracks
Section, Corps of Military Police, Claro Barracks
Section, Corps of Military Police, Uniacke Barracks
Royal Artillery Fixed Defences, Northern Ports
 Royal Artillery Coast Defences, Northern Command, Tynemouth Castle
 Humber Fire Command, Hedon
 Tees and Hartlepool Fire Command, Hartlepool
 Tynemouth Fire Command, Tynemouth

5th Infantry Division 

 5th Infantry Division, Catterick Camp
 Headquarters, 5th Infantry Division commanded by Major General Harold Edmund Franklyn
 5th Infantry Divisional Signals, Royal Corps of Signals, Catterick Camp (cadre)
 5th Infantry Divisional Royal Army Ordnance Corps, Catterick Camp
 5th Company, Corps of Military Police, Catterick Camp
13th Infantry Brigade
 Headquarters 13th Infantry Brigade & Signal Section, Royal Corps of Signals, Catterick Camp
2nd Battalion, Princess Victoria's Royal Irish Fusiliers
2nd Battalion, The Duke of Edinburgh's Wiltshire Regiment
2nd Battalion, The Scottish Rifles (Cameronians)
 13th Infantry Brigade Anti-Tank Company
15th Infantry Brigade
 Headquarters 15th Infantry Brigade & Signal Section, Royal Corps of Signals, Catterick Camp
1st Battalion, The King's Own South Yorkshire Light Infantry, Queen Elizabeth Barracks, Strensall
1st Battalion, The York and Lancaster Regiment
2nd Battalion, The Duke of Albany's Seaforth Highlanders (The Ross-shire Buffs), Glasgow
15th Infantry Brigade Anti-Tank Company
Divisional Royal Artillery (cadre)
Divisional Royal Engineers (cadre)
 55th Field Company, Royal Engineers, Catterick
Divisional Royal Army Service Corps
Headquarters, Divisional Royal Army Service Corps, Catterick Camp
19th Company, Royal Army Service Corps
34th Company, Royal Army Service Corps
51st Company, Royal Army Service Corps

Northumbrian Area 
Northumbrian Area, Darlington: comprising the counties of Northumberland, County Durham, North Riding of Yorkshire (excluding Catterick Area and Strensall Camp), East Riding of Yorkshire; also Berwick-upon-Tweed (except regulars).

 Northumbrian Area Commander: Colonel P. J. Sears
 Northumberland Hussars (TA), Newcastle upon Tyne
 1st East Riding of Yorkshire Yeomanry (TA), Kingston upon Hull
 2nd East Riding of Yorkshire Yeomanry (2/TA), Kingston upon Hull
 7th Battalion, Royal Northumberland Fusiliers (2/TA), Alnwick, machine-gun
 9th Battalion, Royal Northumberland Fusiliers (2/TA), Alnwick, machine-gun
 4th (Durham) Survey Regiment, Royal Artillery (TA), Gateshead-on-Tyne
 6th Survey Regiment, Royal Artillery (2/TA), Gateshead-on-Tyne
 37th (Tyne Electrical Engineers) Light Anti-Aircraft Regiment, Royal Artillery (TA), Tynemouth, not batteries constituted until 1940
 123rd Light Anti-Aircraft Battery, Royal Artillery, RAF Croft
 127th Light Anti-Aircraft Battery, Royal Artillery, RAF Croft
 234th (Northumbrian) Field Company, Royal Engineers (TA), Gateshead-on-Tyne
 506th Field Company, Royal Engineers (TA), Gateshead-on-Tyne
 Royal Northumberland Fusiliers Depot, Newcastle upon Tyne
 East Yorkshire Regiment Depot, Beverley
 Green Howards Depot, Richmond
 Durham Light Infantry Depot, Newcastle upon Tyne
 25th Army Tank Brigade (TA)
 25th Army Tank Brigade Headquarters, Newcastle upon Tyne
 43rd (6th (City) Battalion, The Royal Northumberland Fusiliers) Royal Tank Regiment, Newcastle upon Tyne
 49th Royal Tank Regiment, Newcastle upon Tyne
 51st (Leeds Rifles) Royal Tank Regiment, Leeds
 Northumbrian Area Coastal Defences
Tynemouth Heavy Coastal Regiment, Royal Artillery (TA), Blyth
 East Riding Heavy Coastal Regiment, Royal Artillery (TA), Kingston upon Hull
 Durham Heavy Coastal Regiment, Royal Artillery (TA), Hartlepool
 Tyne Fortress Engineers, Royal Engineers (TA), Tynemouth
 North Riding Fortress Engineers, Royal Engineers (TA), Middlesbrough
 East Riding Fortress Engineers, Royal Engineers (TA), Kingston upon Hull

23rd (Northumbrian) Division (2/TA) 

 23rd (Northumbrian) Division, Darlington
 Headquarters, 23rd (Northumbrian) Division, commanded by Major General William Norman Herbert
23rd (Northumbrian) Divisional Signals, Royal Corps of Signals, Darlington
 8th Battalion, The Royal Northumberland Fusiliers, Prudhoe, motorcycle reconnaissance
23rd Infantry Divisional Royal Army Service Corps, Darlington
 23rd Infantry Divisional Royal Army Ordnance Corps, Darlington
 23rd Infantry Divisional Royal Army Medical Corps, Darlington
 23rd Infantry Divisional Military Police Company, Corps of Military Police, Darlington
69th Infantry Brigade
 Headquarters, 69th Infantry Brigade & Signal Section, Royal Corps of Signals, Malton
 5th Battalion, The Duke of York's Own East Yorkshire Regiment, Kingston upon Hull
 6th Battalion, Alexandra, Princess of Wales's Own (North) Yorkshire Regiment (Green Howards), Richmond
 7th Battalion, Alexandra, Princess of Wales's Own (North) Yorkshire Regiment (Green Howards), Scarborough
70th Infantry Brigade
 Headquarters, 70th Infantry Brigade & Signal Section, Royal Corps of Signals, Durham
 10th Battalion, The Durham Light Infantry, Bishop Auckland
 11th Battalion, The Durham Light Infantry, Sunderland
 12th (Tynside Scottish) Battalion, The Durham Light Infantry, Gateshead-on-Tyne
Divisional Royal Artillery
 Headquarters, Divisional Royal Artillery, Darlington
124th (Northumbrian) Field Regiment, Royal Artillery, Newcastle upon Tyne
 125th (Northumbrian) Field Regiment, Royal Artillery, Sunderland
Divisional Royal Engineers
 Headquarters, Divisional Royal Engineers, Newcastle upon Tyne
233rd (Northumbrian) Field Company, Royal Engineers, Jarrow-on-Tyne
 507th Field Company, Royal Engineers, Newcastle upon Tyne
 508th Field Company, Royal Engineers, Newcastle upon Tyne

50th (Northumbrian) Motor Infantry Division (TA) 

 50th (Northumbrian) Motor Infantry Division, Darlington
 Headquarters, 50th Motor Division, commanded by Major General Sir Giffard Le Quesne Martel
50th (Northumbrian) Divisional Signals, Royal Corps of Signals, Darlington
 4th Battalion, The Royal Northumberland Fusiliers, Alnwick, motorcycle reconnaissance
50th Infantry Divisional Royal Army Service Corps, Darlington
 50th Infantry Divisional Royal Army Ordnance Corps, Darlington
149th (Northumbrian) Field Ambulance, Royal Army Medical Corps, Darlington
150th (Northumbrian) Field Ambulance, Royal Army Medical Corps, Darlington
151st (Northumbrian) Field Ambulance, Royal Army Medical Corps, Darlington
 50th Infantry Divisional Military Police Company, Corps of Military Police, Darlington
150th Infantry Brigade
 Headquarters, 150th Infantry Brigade & Signal Section, Royal Corps of Signals, Malton
 4th Battalion, The Duke of York's Own East Yorkshire Regiment, Kingston upon Hull
 4th Battalion, Alexandra, Princess of Wales's Own (North) Yorkshire Regiment (Green Howards), Richmond
 5th Battalion, Alexandra, Princess of Wales's Own (North) Yorkshire Regiment (Green Howards), Scarborough
151st Infantry Brigade
 Headquarters, 151st Infantry Brigade & Signal Section, Royal Corps of Signals, Durham
 6th Battalion, The Durham Light Infantry, Bishop Auckland
 8th Battalion, The Durham Light Infantry, Sunderland
 9th Battalion, The Durham Light Infantry, Gateshead-on-Tyne
Divisional Royal Artillery
 Headquarters, Divisional Royal Artillery, Darlington
72nd (Northumbrian) Field Regiment, Royal Artillery, Newcastle upon Tyne
 74th (Northumbrian) Field Regiment, Royal Artillery, South Shields
Divisional Royal Engineers
 Headquarters, Divisional Royal Engineers, Newcastle upon Tyne
232nd (Northumbrian) Field Company, Royal Engineers, Newcastle upon Tyne
 505th Field Company, Royal Engineers, Newcastle upon Tyne
 235th (Northumbrian) Field Park Company, Royal Engineers, Gateshead-on-Tyne

West Riding Area 
West Riding Area: York, covering West Riding of Yorkshire, County Borough of York, Strensall Camp, Lincolnshire, Rutlandshire, Leicestershire, Nottinghamshire, and Derbyshire.

 Headquarters West Riding Area, York under Area Commander Brigadier Richard Montague Wootten
 West Riding Area Signal Section, Royal Corps of Signals, York
 Leicestershire Yeomanry (TA), Derby
 1st Derbyshire Yeomanry (TA), Derby
 2nd Derbyshire Yeomanry (TA), Derby
60th (North Midland) Field Regiment, Royal Artillery (TA), Lincoln
115th (North Midland) Field Regiment, Royal Artillery (2/TA), Leicester
107th (South Nottinghamshire Hussars Yeomanry) Field Regiment, Royal Horse Artillery (TA), Nottingham
150th (South Nottinghamshire Hussars) Field Regiment, Royal Horse Artillery (2/TA), Nottingham
 27th Light Anti-Aircraft Regiment, Royal Artillery, Newark-on-Trent
 38th Light Anti-Aircraft Regiment, Royal Artillery, Bradford
 39th Light Anti-Aircraft Regiment, Royal Artillery, Lincoln
 52nd Light Anti-Aircraft Battery, Royal Artillery, Thorncliffe
 106th Light Anti-Aircraft Battery, Royal Artillery, RAF Waddington
 109th Light Anti-Aircraft Battery, Royal Artillery, RAF Hemswell
 126th Light Anti-Aircraft Battery, Royal Artillery, RAF Coal Aston
53rd (King's Own Yorkshire Light Infantry) Light Anti-Aircraft Regiment, Royal Artillery (TA), Doncaster
57th (King's Own Yorkshire Light Infantry) Light Anti-Aircraft Regiment, Royal Artillery (2/TA), Doncaster
 1st Field Artillery Depot, Harrogate
 4th Infantry Training Group, Ripon
 Lincolnshire Regiment Depot, Lincoln
 West Yorkshire Regiment Depot, York
 Leicestershire Regiment Depot, Leicester
 The Duke of Wellington's Regiment Depot, Halifax
 Nottinghamshire and Derbyshire Regiment (Sherwood Foresters) Depot, Derby
 King's Own (South) Yorkshire Light Infantry Depot, Pontefract
 York and Lancaster Regiment Depot, Pontefract
 Anti-Aircraft Training Depot, Royal Corps of Signals, Harrogate
 Training Depot, Royal Engineers, Ripon
 5th Cavalry Brigade (TA), Bootham
 Headquarters, 5th Cavalry Brigade
The Queen's Own (South) Yorkshire Dragoons, Doncaster
Alexandra, Princess of Wales's Own (North) Yorkshire Hussars, York
Nottinghamshire Yeomanry (Sherwood Rangers), Nottingham

46th Infantry Division (2/TA) 

 46th Infantry Division, York
 Headquarters 46th Infantry Division commanded by Major General Algeron Lee Ransome
 46th Infantry Divisional Signals, Royal Corps of Signals, Leeds
46th Infantry Divisional Royal Army Service Corps, York
 46th Infantry Divisional Royal Army Ordnance Corps, York
 46th Infantry Divisional Royal Army Medical Corps, York
 46th Infantry Divisional Military Police Company, Corps of Military Police, York
137th Infantry Brigade
 Headquarters 137th Infantry Brigade & Signal Section, Royal Corps of Signals, Leeds
 2/5th Battalion, The Prince of Wales's Own West Yorkshire Regiment, York
 2/6th Battalion, The Duke of Wellington's West Riding Regiment, Scarborough
 2/7th Battalion, The Duke of Wellington's West Riding Regiment, Milnsbridge
138th Infantry Brigade
 Headquarters 138th Infantry Brigade & Signal Section, Royal Corps of Signals, Wakefield
6th Battalion, The Lincolnshire Regiment, Lincoln
2/4th Battalion, The King's Own (South Yorkshire) Light Infantry, Wakefield
6th Battalion, The York and Lancaster Regiment, Sheffield
139th Infantry Brigade
Headquarters 139th Infantry Brigade & Signal Section, Royal Corps of Signals, Leicester
2/5th Battalion, The Leicestershire Regiment, Leicester
2/5th Battalion, The Nottinghamshire and Derbyshire Regiment (The Sherwood Foresters), Derby
9th Battalion, The Nottinghamshire and Derbyshire Regiment (The Sherwood Foresters), Newark-on-Trent
Divisional Royal Artillery 46th Division
Headquarters, Divisional Royal Artillery, York
121st Field Regiment, Royal Artillery, Leeds
122nd Field Regiment, Royal Artillery, Halifax
123rd Field Regiment, Royal Artillery, Sheffield
68th Anti-Tank Regiment, Royal Artillery, Bridlington
Divisional Royal Engineers 46th Division
Headquarters, Divisional Royal Engineers, Sheffield
270th Field Company, Royal Engineers, Sheffield
271st Field Company, Royal Engineers, Sheffield
272nd Field Company, Royal Engineers, Sheffield
273rd Field Park Company, Royal Engineers, Sheffield

49th (West Riding) Infantry Division (TA) 

 49th (West Riding) Infantry Division, Clifton
 Headquarters, 49th Infantry Division commanded by Major General Pierse Joseph Mackesy
 49th (West Riding) Divisional Signals, Royal Corps of Signals, Leeds
49th Infantry Divisional Royal Army Service Corps, Clifton
 49th Infantry Divisional Royal Army Ordnance Corps, Clifton
 49th Infantry Divisional Royal Army Medical Corps, Clifton
 49th Infantry Divisional Military Police Company, Corps of Military Police, Clifton
146th Infantry Brigade
 Headquarters 146th Infantry Brigade & Signal Section, Royal Corps of Signals, Doncaster
 4th Battalion, The Lincolnshire Regiment, Lincoln
 1/4th Battalion, The King's Own (South) Yorkshire Light Infantry, Wakefield
 The Hallamshire Battalion, The York and Lancaster Regiment, Sheffield
147th Infantry Brigade
 Headquarters 147th Infantry Brigade & Signal Section, Royal Corps of Signals, Rastrick
 1/5th Battalion, The Prince of Wales's Own West Yorkshire Regiment, York
 1/6th Battalion, The Duke of Wellington's West Riding Regiment, Scarborough
 1/7th Battalion, The Duke of Wellington's West Riding Regiment, Milnsbridge
148th Infantry Brigade
 Headquarters 148th Infantry Brigade & Signal Section, Royal Corps of Signals, Nottingham
 1/5th Battalion, The Leicestershire Regiment, Leicester
1/5th Battalion, The Nottinghamshire and Derbyshire Regiment (The Sherwood Foresters), Derby
8th Battalion, The Nottinghamshire and Derbyshire Regiment (The Sherwood Foresters), Newark-on-Trent
Divisional Royal Artillery 49th Division
 Headquarters, Divisional Royal Artillery, York
69th (West Riding) Field Regiment, Royal Artillery, Leeds
70th (West Riding) Field Regiment, Royal Artillery, Halifax
 71st (West Riding) Field Regiment, Royal Artillery, Sheffield
58th (Duke of Wellington's Regiment) Anti-Tank Regiment, Royal Artillery, Bridlington
Divisional Royal Engineers 49th Division
 Headquarters, Divisional Royal Engineers, Sheffield
228th (West Riding) Field Company, Royal Engineers, Sheffield
 229th (West Riding) Field Company, Royal Engineers, Sheffield
 230th (West Riding) Field Company, Royal Engineers, Sheffield
 231st (West Riding) Field Park Company, Royal Engineers, Sheffield

Scottish Command 
Scottish Command, Edinburgh covered Scotland and Berwick-upon-Tweed (so far as regards Regulars and Militia only).

 Headquarters Scottish Command, Edinburgh under General Officer Commanding-in-Chief, Scottish Command: General Sir Charles John Cecil Grant
 Scottish Command Pay Detachment, Royal Army Pay Corps, Edinburgh
 Scottish Command Pay Detachment, Royal Army Pay Corps, Leith and Edinburgh
 Scottish Command Pay Detachment, Royal Army Pay Corps, Perth
 Scottish Command Signal Company, Royal Corps of Signals, Edinburgh
 General Headquarters Signals, Royal Corps of Signals (SR), Glasgow
 1st General Headquarters Signal Company, Royal Corps of Signals, Glasgow
 3rd General Headquarters Signal Company, Royal Corps of Signals, Edinburgh
 2nd Battalion, The Royal Scots Fusiliers, Edinburgh
 1st Battalion, The City of Glasgow Regiment (Highland Light Infantry), Fort George
 12th Field Regiment, Royal Artillery, Dunbar
 Detachment, The Survey Battalion, Royal Engineers, Edinburgh
 103rd (Glasgow) Army Troops Company, Royal Engineers (SR), Glasgow
 109th (Glasgow) Workshop and Park Company, Royal Engineers (SR), Glasgow
 11th Section, Royal Army Ordnance Corps, Stirling
 13th Company, Royal Army Medical Corps, Edinburgh
 Royal Artillery Fixed Defences, Scottish Ports
 Headquarters, Scottish Coastal Defences, Leith
 Forth Fire Command, Leith
 Clyde Fire Command, Gourock
 Orkneys Fire Command, Orkney

Highland Area 
Highland Area, Perth: covering the counties of Sutherland, Caithness, Ross and Cromarty, Inverness-shire, Nairnshire, Morayshire, Banffshire, Aberdeenshire, Kincardineshire, Angus, Perthshire, Kinross-shire, Fifeshire, Clackmannanshire, Stirlingshire, Dumbartonshire, Renfrewshire, Buteshire, and Argyllshire.

 Headquarters, Highland Area, Perth
 Lovat Scouts (TA), Inverness
 Scottish Horse (TA), Dunkeld
 1st Fife and Forfar Yeomanry (TA), Kirkcaldy
 2nd Fife and Forfar Yeomanry (2/TA), Dundee
 4th (The City of Aberdeen) Battalion, Gordon Highlanders (TA), Aberdeen, machine-gun
 8th (The City of Aberdeen) Battalion, Gordon Highlanders (2/TA), Aberdeen, machine-gun
 5th (Renfrewshire) Battalion, The Argyll and Sutherland Highlanders (TA), Paisley
 6th (Renfrewshire) Battalion, The Argyll and Sutherland Highlanders (TA), Paisley
 56th (Highland) Medium Regiment, Royal Artillery (TA), Aberdeen
 65th (Highland) Medium Regiment, Royal Artillery (TA), Fraserborough
 54th (Argyll and Sutherland Highlanders) Light Anti-Aircraft Regiment, Royal Artillery (TA), Dumbarton Castle
 58th (Argyll and Sutherland Highlanders) Light Anti-Aircraft Regiment, Royal Artillery (2/TA), Clydebank
 100th Light Anti-Aircraft Battery, Royal Artillery (TA), RAF Montrose
 102nd Light Anti-Aircraft Battery, Royal Artillery (TA), RAF Donibristle
 104th Light Anti-Aircraft Battery, Royal Artillery (TA), RAF Stranraer
 105th Light Anti-Aircraft Battery, Royal Artillery (TA), Scapa Flow
 Orkneys Heavy Regiment, Royal Artillery (TA)
 Fife Heavy Regiment, Royal Artillery (TA)
 Orkneys Fortress Engineers, Royal Engineers (TA)
 The Royal Highland Regiment (The Black Watch) Depot, Perth
 The Duke of Albany's Seaforth Highlanders (The Ross-shire Buffs) Depot, Fort George
 Gordon Highlanders Depot, Aberdeen
 The Queen's Own Cameron Highlanders Depot, Inverness
 The Argyll and Sutherland Highlanders (Princess Louise's) Depot, Stirling

9th (Scottish) Infantry Division (2/TA) 

 9th (Scottish) Infantry Division, Perth
 Headquarters, 9th (Scottish) Division commanded by Major General George Mackintosh Lindsay
 9th (Scottish) Divisional Signals, Royal Corps of Signals, Perth
9th Infantry Divisional Royal Army Service Corps, Perth
 9th Infantry Divisional Royal Army Ordnance Corps, Perth
 9th Infantry Divisional Royal Army Medical Corps, Perth
 9th Infantry Divisional Military Police Company, Corps of Military Police, Perth
26th Infantry Brigade
 Headquarters, 26th Infantry Brigade & Signal Section, Royal Corps of Signals, Inverness
 5th (Sutherland and Caithness) Battalion, The Duke of Albany's Seaforth Highlanders (The Ross-shire Buffs), Golspie
 7th (Morayshire) Battalion, The Duke of Albany's Seaforth Highlanders (The Ross-shire Buffs), Elgin
 5th Battalion, The Queen's Own Cameron Highlanders, Inverness
27th Infantry Brigade
 Headquarters, 27th Infantry Brigade & Signal Section, Royal Corps of Signals, Aberdeen
 5th (Angus and Dundee) Battalion, The Royal Highland Regiment (The Black Watch), Dundee
 7th (Mars and Mearns) Battalion, Gordon Highlanders, Tarves
 9th (Donside) Battalion, Gordon Highlanders, Aberdeen
28th Infantry Brigade
 Headquarters, 28th Infantry Brigade & Signal Section, Royal Corps of Signals, Stirling
 7th (Fife) Battalion, The Royal Highland Regiment (The Black Watch), St Andrews
 10th Battalion, Princess Louises's Argyll and Sutherland Highlanders, Stirling
 11th (Argyll and Dumbarton) Battalion, Princess Louises's Argyll and Sutherland Highlanders, Oban
Divisional Royal Artillery 9th Division
 Headquarters, Divisional Royal Artillery, Perth
126th (Highland) Field Regiment, Royal Artillery, Aberdeen
127th (Highland) Field Regiment, Royal Artillery, Dundee
128th (Highland) Field Regiment, Royal Artillery, Renfrew
61st (West Highland) Anti-Tank Regiment, Royal Artillery, Rothesay
Divisional Royal Engineers 9th Division
 Headquarters, Divisional Royal Engineers, Aberdeen
274th Field Company, Royal Engineers, Alness
 275th Field Company, Royal Engineers, Stromness
 276th Field Company, Royal Engineers, Paisley
 277th Field Park Company, Royal Engineers, Dundee

51st (Highland) Infantry Division (TA) 

 51st (Highland) Infantry Division, Perth
 Headquarters, 51st (Highland) Infantry Division commanded by Major General Victor Morven Fortune
 51st (Highland) Divisional Signals, Royal Corps of Signals, Aberdeen
51st Infantry Divisional Royal Army Service Corps, Perth
 51st Infantry Divisional Royal Army Ordnance Corps, Perth
 51st Infantry Divisional Royal Army Medical Corps, Perth
 51st Infantry Divisional Military Police Company, Corps of Military Police, Perth
152nd (Highland) Infantry Brigade
 Headquarters, 152nd Infantry Brigade & Signal Section, Royal Corps of Signals, Inverness
 4th (Ross-shire) Battalion, The Duke of Albany's Seaforth Highlanders (The Ross-shire Buffs), Golspie
 6th (Morayshire) Battalion, The Duke of Albany's Seaforth Highlanders (The Ross-shire Buffs), Elgin
 4th Battalion, The Queen's Own Cameron Highlanders, Inverness
153rd (Highland) Infantry Brigade
 Headquarters, 153rd Infantry Brigade & Signal Section, Royal Corps of Signals, Aberdeen
 4th (City of Dundee) Battalion, The Royal Highland Regiment (The Black Watch), Dundee
 5th (Buchan and Formartin) Battalion, Gordon Highlanders, Tarves
 6th (Banffshire) Battalion, Gordon Highlanders, Aberdeen
154th (Highland) Infantry Brigade
 Headquarters, 154th Infantry Brigade & Signal Section, Royal Corps of Signals, Stirling
 6th (Perthshire) Battalion, The Royal Highland Regiment (The Black Watch), St Andrews
 7th Battalion, Princess Louises's Argyll and Sutherland Highlanders, Stirling
 8th (Argyllshire) Battalion, Princess Louises's Argyll and Sutherland Highlanders, Oban
Divisional Royal Artillery 51st Division
 Headquarters, Divisional Royal Artillery, Perth
75th (Highland) Field Regiment, Royal Artillery, Aberdeen
76th (Highland) Field Regiment, Royal Artillery, Dundee
77th (Highland) Field Regiment, Royal Artillery, Renfrew
51st (West Highland) Anti-Tank Regiment, Royal Artillery, Rothesay
Divisional Royal Engineers 51st Division
 Headquarters, Divisional Royal Engineers, Aberdeen
236th (City of Aberdeen) Field Company, Royal Engineers, Aberdeen
 237th (City of Dundee) Field Company, Royal Engineers, Dundee
 238th (County of Renfrewshire) Field Company, Royal Engineers, Renfrew
 239th (City of Aberdeen) Field Company, Royal Engineers, Aberdeen

Lowland Area 
Lowland Area, Darlington: comprising the counties of West Lothian, Midlothian, East Lothian, Berwickshire (including Berwick-upon-Tweed for Regulars and Militia only), Roxburghshire, Dumfriesshire, Kirkcudbrightshire, Wigtownshire, Ayrshire, Lanarkshire, Peeblesshire, Selkirkshire; and (for Clyde and Forth Defences only), and Fifeshire.

 Headquarters, Lowland Area in Darlington
 The Earl of Carrick's Own Ayrshire Yeomanry (TA), Ayr
 Lanarkshire Yeomanry (TA), Lanark
 1st Lothians and Border Horse (TA), Edinburgh
 2nd Lothians and Border Horse (2/TA), Ladybank
 57th (Lowland) Medium Regiment, Royal Artillery (TA), Edinburgh
 66th (Lowland) Medium Regiment, Royal Artillery (TA), Prestonpans
 The Royal Scots (Lothian Regiment) Depot, Milton Bridge
 Royal Scots Fusiliers Depot, Ayr
 The King's Own Scottish Borderers Depot, Berwick-upon-Tweed
 The Scottish Rifles (Cameronians) Depot, Hamilton
 The City of Glasgow Regiment (Highland Light Infantry) Depot, Glasgow
 14th Searchlight Depot, Royal Artillery (SR), Troon
 Lowland Coast Defences
Forth Heavy Regiment, Royal Artillery (TA), Edinburgh
 Clyde Heavy Regiment, Royal Artillery (TA), Port Glasgow
 City of Edinburgh Fortress Engineers, Royal Engineers (TA), Edinburgh
 Renfrewshire Fortress Engineer, Royal Engineers (TA), Greenock

15th (Scottish) Infantry Division (2/TA) 

 15th (Scottish) Infantry Division, Glasgow
 Headquarters, 52nd (Lowland) Infantry Division commanded by Major General Roland Le Fanu
 15th Divisional Signals, Royal Corps of Signals, Glasgow
15th Infantry Divisional Royal Army Service Corps, Glasgow
 15th Infantry Divisional Royal Army Ordnance Corps, Glasgow
 15th Infantry Divisional Royal Army Medical Corps, Glasgow
 15th Infantry Divisional Military Police Company, Corps of Military Police, Glasgow
44th Infantry Brigade
 Headquarters, 155th Infantry Brigade & Signal Section, Royal Corps of Signals, Edinburgh
 8th (Lothians and Peeblesshire) Battalion, The Royal Scots (Royal Lothian Regiment), Leith
 6th (The Border), The King's Own Scottish Borderers, Galashiels
 7th (Galloway) Battalion, The King's Own Scottish Borderers, Dumfries
45th Infantry Brigade
 Headquarters, 156th Infantry Brigade & Signal Section, Royal Corps of Signals, Glasgow
 6th Battalion, The Royal Scots Fusiliers, Kilmarnock
 9th Battalion, The Scottish Rifles (Cameronians), Hamilton
 10th (Lanarkshire) Battalion, The Scottish Rifles (Cameronians), Glasgow
46th Infantry Brigade
 Headquarters, 157th Infantry Brigade & Signal Section, Royal Corps of Signals, Glasgow
 10th Battalion, The City of Glasgow Regiment (Highland Light Infantry), Glasgow
 11th Battalion, The City of Glasgow Regiment (Highland Light Infantry), Glasgow
 2nd Battalion, The Glasgow Highlanders, Glasgow
Divisional Royal Artillery
 Divisional Royal Artillery, Glasgow
129th Field Regiment, Royal Artillery, Edinburgh
 130th Field Regiment, Royal Artillery, Ayr
 131st Field Regiment, Royal Artillery, Glasgow
 64th Anti-Tank Regiment, Royal Artillery, Glasgow
Divisional Royal Engineers
 Headquarters, Divisional Royal Engineers, Baillieston
278th Field Company, Royal Engineers, Coatbridge
279th Field Company, Royal Engineers, Motherwell
280th Field Company, Royal Engineers, Rutherglen
281st Field Company, Royal Engineers, Rutherglen

52nd (Lowland) Infantry Division (TA) 

 52nd (Lowland) Infantry Division, Glasgow
 Headquarters, 52nd (Lowland) Infantry Division commanded by Major General James Syme Drew
 52nd (Lowland) Infantry Divisional Signals, Royal Corps of Signals, Glasgow
52nd Infantry Divisional Royal Army Service Corps, Glasgow
 52nd Infantry Divisional Royal Army Ordnance Corps, Glasgow
 52nd Infantry Divisional Royal Army Medical Corps, Glasgow
 52nd Infantry Divisional Military Police Company, Corps of Military Police, Glasgow
155th (South Scottish) Infantry Brigade, Edinburgh
 Headquarters, 155th Infantry Brigade & Signal Section, Royal Corps of Signals
 7th/9th (Highlanders) Battalion, The Royal Scots (Royal Lothian Regiment), Leith
 4th (The Border) Battalion, The King's Own Scottish Borderers, Galashiels
 5th (Dumfrieshire) Battalion, The King's Own Scottish Borderers, Dumfries
156th (Scottish Rifles) Infantry Brigade, Glasgow
 Headquarters, 156th Infantry Brigade & Signal Section, Royal Corps of Signals
 4th/5th Battalion, The Royal Scots Fusiliers, Kilmarnock
 6th (Lanarkshire) Battalion, The Scottish Rifles (Cameronians), Hamilton
 7th Battalion, The Scottish Rifles (Cameronians), Glasgow
157th (Highland Light Infantry) Infantry Brigade, Glasgow
 Headquarters, 157th Infantry Brigade & Signal Section, Royal Corps of Signals
 5th (City of Glasgow) Battalion, The City of Glasgow Regiment (Highland Light Infantry), Glasgow
 6th (City of Glasgow) Battalion, The City of Glasgow Regiment (Highland Light Infantry), Glasgow
 1st Battalion, The Glasgow Highlanders, Glasgow
Divisional Royal Artillery
 Divisional Royal Artillery, Glasgow
78th (Lowland) Field Regiment, Royal Artillery, Edinburgh
79th (Lowland) Field Regiment, Royal Artillery, Ayr
80th (Lowland - City of Glasgow) Field Regiment, Royal Artillery, Glasgow
54th (The Queen's Own Royal Glasgow Yeomanry) Anti-Tank Regiment, Royal Artillery, Glasgow
Divisional Royal Engineers
 Divisional Royal Engineers, Rutherglen
240th (Lowland) Field Company, Royal Engineers, Coatbridge
 241st (Lowland) Field Company, Royal Engineers, Motherwell
 242nd (Lowland) Field Company, Royal Engineers, Rutherglen
 243rd (Lowland) Field Park Company, Royal Engineers, Rutherglen

Eastern Command 
Eastern Command was one of two southern commands, itself overseeing the areas of: Cambridgeshire, Norfolk, Suffolk, Essex (except Purfleet and Rainham rifle ranges; and (when occupied by Foot Guards) the Guards' barracks at Warley Barracks), Hertfordshire, Bedfordshire, Middlesex, Kent, Sussex, and Surrey (less portion in the Aldershot Command and London District), and Woolwich Garrison (exclusive of the Territorial Army troops quartered there).

Headquarters, Eastern Command, Cavalry Barracks, Hounslow commanded by Lieutenant General Sir Guy Williams
Eastern Command Pay Detachment, Royal Army Pay Corps, Barnet
Eastern Command Pay Detachment, Royal Army Pay Corps, Canterbury
Eastern Command Pay Detachment, Royal Army Pay Corps, Chatham
Eastern Command Pay Detachment, Royal Army Pay Corps, Foots Cray
Eastern Command Pay Detachment, Royal Army Pay Corps, Hounslow
Eastern Command Pay Detachment, Royal Army Pay Corps, Warley
Eastern Command Pay Detachment, Royal Army Pay Corps, London
Eastern Command Signal Company, Royal Corps of Signals, London
 8th Artillery Signal Section, Royal Corps of Signals, Canterbury
 10th Artillery Signal Section, Royal Corps of Signals, Canterbury
 13th Artillery Signal Section, Royal Corps of Signals, Canterbury
 Signal Experimental Establishment, Royal Corps of Signals, Woolwich
5th Construction Signal Section, Royal Corps of Signals (SR), Ravenscourt Park
1st Line Signal Section, Royal Corps of Signals (SR), Guildford
2nd Line Signal Section, Royal Corps of Signals (SR), Guildford
 17th/21st Lancers, Colchester
 2nd Battalion, The Essex Regiment, Warley Barracks
1st Infantry Training Group, Colchester
 2nd Infantry Training Group, Lydd
27th Field Regiment, Royal Artillery, Colchester
 32nd Field Regiment, Royal Artillery, Preston Barracks
 5th Medium Regiment, Royal Artillery, Royal Artillery School of Gunnery
 2nd Heavy Regiment, Royal Artillery, Royal Artillery School of Gunnery
The Riding Establishment, Royal Artillery, St John's Wood
Detachment from The Survey Battalion, Royal Engineers, London
108th (Essex) Electrical and Mechanical Company, Royal Engineers (SR), Chelmsford
Royal Army Service Corps Driving School, Feltham Barracks
2nd Company, Royal Army Service Corps, Woolwich Garrison
18th Company, Royal Army Service Corps, Kitchener Barracks
22nd Company, Royal Army Service Corps, Shorncliffe Army Camp
37th Company, Royal Army Service Corps, Woolwich Garrison
38th Company, Royal Army Service Corps, Woolwich Garrison
45th Company, Royal Army Service Corps, Woolwich Garrison
46th Company, Royal Army Service Corps, Shorncliffe Army Camp
57th Company, Royal Army Service Corps, Colchester Garrison
59th Company, Royal Army Service Corps, Colchester Garrison
60th Company, Royal Army Service Corps, Woolwich Garrison
F Company, Royal Army Service Corps, Woolwich Garrison
Maintenance Stores Depot, Royal Army Service Corps, Feltham Barracks
Heavy Maintenance Repair Shop, Royal Army Service Corps, Feltham Barracks
Vehicle Reserve Depot, Royal Army Service Corps, Feltham Barracks
Non-combatant Labour Corps Depot, Colchester
7th Section, Royal Army Ordnance Corps, Dover
8th Section, Royal Army Ordnance Corps, Colchester
9th Company, Royal Army Medical Corps, Colchester
10th Company, Royal Army Medical Corps, Shorncliffe
12th Company, Royal Army Medical Corps, Woolwich
18th Company, Royal Army Medical Corps, Millbank Barracks
Veterinary Platoon, Royal Army Veterinary Corps, Woolwich
Veterinary Platoon, Royal Army Veterinary Corps, Colchester
Veterinary Platoon, Royal Army Veterinary Corps, Shorncliffe
Veterinary Platoon, Royal Army Veterinary Corps, Dover
1st Veterinary Depot, Royal Army Veterinary Corps, Woolwich
Section, Corps of Military Police, Colchester Garrison
Section, Corps of Military Police, Shorncliffe Army Camp
Section, Corps of Military Police, Shorncliffe Army Camp
Section, Corps of Military Police, Dover
Section, Corps of Military Police, Kitchener Barracks
Section, Corps of Military Police, Woolwich Garrison
Section, Corps of Military Police, Woolwich Garrison
 Eastern Command Coastal Artillery
 Headquarters, Royal Artillery Fixed Defences, Eastern Ports, Sheerness Dockyard
 Dover Fire Command, Royal Navy Dockyard
 Thames Fire Command, Shoeburyness
 Medway Fire Command, Sheerness Dockyard
 Harwich Fire Command, Port of Felixstowe

4th Infantry Division 

 4th Infantry Division, Colchester Garrison
 Headquarters, 4th Infantry Division commanded by Major General Dudley Graham Johnson
 4th Infantry Divisional Signals, Royal Corps of Signals, Colchester
 5th Royal Inniskilling Dragoon Guards, Colchester, divisional reconnaissance
 2nd Battalion, The Royal Northumberland Fusiliers, Colchester, divisional machine-gun battalion
 4th Infantry Divisional Royal Army Ordnance Corps, Colchester Garrison
 4th Infantry Divisional Royal Army Medical Corps, Colchester Garrison
10th Infantry Brigade
 Headquarters, 10th Infantry Brigade & Signal Section, Royal Corps of Signals, Shorncliffe Army Camp
 2nd Battalion, The Bedfordshire and Hertfordshire Regiment, Milton Barracks
 2nd Battalion, The Duke of Cornwall's Light Infantry
 1st Battalion, The Queen's Own Royal West Kent Regiment
 10th Infantry Brigade Anti-Tank Company
11th Infantry Brigade
 Headquarters, 11th Infantry Brigade & Signal Section, Royal Corps of Signals, Colchester Garrison
 2nd Battalion, The Lancashire Fusiliers
 1st Battalion, The East Surrey Regiment
 1st Battalion, The Oxfordshire and Buckinghamshire Light Infantry
 11th Infantry Brigade Anti-Tank Company
12th Infantry Brigade
 Headquarters, 12th Infantry Brigade & Signal Section, Royal Corps of Signals, Dover Western Heights
 2nd Battalion, The City of London Regiment (Royal Fusiliers)
 1st Battalion, The Prince of Wales's South Lancashire Volunteers
 1st Battalion, The Royal Highland Regiment (The Black Watch)
 12th Infantry Brigade Anti-Tank Company
Divisional Royal Artillery
 Headquarters, Divisional Royal Artillery, Colchester Garrison
 17th Field Regiment, Royal Artillery, Woolwich
 22nd Field Regiment, Royal Artillery, Shorncliffe Army Camp
 30th Field Regiment, Royal Artillery
 14th Anti-Tank Regiment, Royal Artillery
Divisional Royal Engineers
Headquarters, Divisional Royal Engineers, Shorncliffe Army Camp
7th Field Company, Royal Engineers
9th Field Company, Royal Engineers
29th Field Company, Royal Engineers, Canterbury Barracks
18th Field Park Company, Royal Engineers, Colchester Garrison
Divisional Royal Army Service Corps
Headquarters, Divisional Royal Army Service Corps, Colchester Garrison
21st Company, Royal Army Service Corps
44th Company, Royal Army Service Corps, Woolwich Garrison

East Anglian Area 
East Anglian Area covered the counties of Cambridgeshire, Norfolk, Suffolk, Essex, Middlesex, Hertfordshire, and Bedfordshire (less the following: Colchester Garrison, Purfleet Rifle Range, and Rainham rifle ranges (when occupied by the Foot Guards) the Guards' Barracks at Warley Barracks which area under London District, That partition of Essex in Chatham Area from Grays Thurrock Station along main road to Stanford-le-Hope, thence north side of railway via South Benfleet to Southend-on-Sea borough boundary - thence a line drawn north-east to Lower Edward's Hall - thence road eastwords to Harp House - thence a line south-east to Southchurch Lawn - thence a line due north to River Roach - thence along south bank of River Roach and south bank of River Crouch to Foulness Point).

 East Anglian Area Headquarters, The Barracks, Herford commanded by Area Commander Colonel W. P. Buckley
 1/7th Battalion, The Duke of Cambridge's Own Middlesex Regiment, Hornsey
 2/7th Battalion, The Duke of Cambridge's Own Middlesex Regiment, Southgate
 1/8th Battalion, The Duke of Cambridge's Own Middlesex Regiment, Hounslow
 2/8th Battalion, The Duke of Cambridge's Own Middlesex Regiment, Ruislip Manor
 Norfolk Regiment Depot, Britannia Barracks
 Suffolk Regiment Depot, Gibraltar Barracks
 Bedfordshire and Hertfordshire Regiment Depot, Kempston Barracks
 Essex Regiment Depot, Warley Barracks
 Middlesex Regiment Depot, Inglis Barracks
 104th (Essex Yeomanry) Field Regiment, Royal Horse Artillery, Brentwood
 147th (Essex Yeomanry) Field Regiment, Royal Artillery, Chelmsford
 58th (Suffolk) Medium Regiment, Royal Artillery, Ipswich
 67th (Suffolk) Medium Regiment, Royal Artillery, Bury St Edmunds
 Suffolk Heavy Regiment, Royal Artillery, Dovercourt
 97th Light Anti-Aircraft Battery, Royal Artillery, RAF Hounslow
 119th Light Anti-Aircraft Battery, Royal Artillery, RAF Westley
 250th (East Anglian) Field Company, Royal Engineers, Cambridge
 Suffolk Fortress Engineers, Royal Engineers, Ipswich

18th Infantry Division (2/TA) 

 18th (Eastern) Infantry Division, Hertford
 Headquarters, 18th Infantry Division commanded by Major General Thomas Gerald Dalby
 18th (Eastern) Infantry Divisional Signals, Royal Corps of Signals, Stratford
18th Infantry Divisional Royal Army Service Corps, Stratford
 18th Infantry Divisional Royal Army Ordnance Corps, Stratford
 18th Infantry Divisional Military Police Company, Corps of Military Police, Stratford
54th Infantry Brigade
 Headquarters, 54th Infantry Brigade & Signal Section, Royal Corps of Signals, Norwich
 4th Battalion, The Royal Norfolk Regiment, Norwich
 4th Battalion, The Suffolk Regiment, Ipswich
 5th Battalion, The Suffolk Regiment, Bury St Edmunds
55th Infantry Brigade
 Headquarters, 55th Infantry Brigade & Signal Section, Royal Corps of Signals, Bedford
 5th Battalion, The Bedfordshire and Hertfordshire Regiment, Bedford
 1st Battalion, The Cambridgeshire Regiment, Cambridge
 2nd Battalion, The Cambridgeshire Regiment, Wisbech
Divisional Royal Artillery
 Headquarters, 18th Divisional Royal Artillery, The Barracks, Hertford
105th (Bedfordshire Yeomanry) Field Regiment, Royal Artillery, Bedford
 135th Field Regiment, Royal Artillery, Hitchin
 148th Field Regiment, Royal Artillery, Luton
 65th (Norfolk Yeomanry) Anti-Tank Regiment, Royal Artillery, Swaffham
Divisional Royal Engineers
 Headquarters, 18th Divisional Royal Engineers, Cambridge
 287th Field Company, Royal Engineers, Cambridge
 288th Field Company, Royal Engineers, Norwich
 251st (East Anglia) Field Park Company, Royal Engineers, Norwich

54th (East Anglian) Infantry Division (TA) 

 54th (East Anglian) Infantry Division, Hertford
 Headquarters, 54th Infantry Division commanded by Major General John Hedley Thornton Priestman
 54th (East Anglian) Infantry Divisional Signals, Royal Corps of Signals, Stratford
54th Infantry Divisional Royal Army Service Corps, Hertford
 54th Infantry Divisional Royal Army Ordnance Corps, Hertford
 54th Infantry Divisional Royal Army Medical Corps, Hertford
 54th Infantry Divisional Military Police Company, Corps of Military Police, Hertford
161st (Essex and London) Infantry Brigade
 Headquarters, 161st Infantry Brigade & Signal Section, Royal Corps of Signals, Brentwood
 1/4th Battalion, The Essex Regiment, Chelmsford
 2/4th Battalion, The Essex Regiment, Ilford
 1/5th Battalion, The Essex Regiment, Braintree
 2/5th (East) Battalion, The Essex Regiment, Colchester
 5th (Hackney) Battalion, Princess Charlotte of Wales's Royal Berkshire Regiment, Hackney
 7th (Stoke Newington) Battalion, Princess Charlotte of Wales's Royal Berkshire Regiment, Stoke Newington
162nd (East Midland) Infantry Brigade
 Headquarters, 162nd Infantry Brigade & Signal Section, Royal Corps of Signals, Bedford
 6th Battalion, The Bedfordshire and Hertfordshire Regiment, Bedford
 1st Battalion, The Hertfordshire Regiment, Hertford
 2nd Battalion, The Hertfordshire Regiment, Hertford
163rd (Norfolk) Infantry Brigade
 Headquarters, 163rd Infantry Brigade & Signal Section, Royal Corps of Signals, Norwich
 5th Battalion, The Royal Norfolk Regiment, Dereham
 6th Battalion, The Royal Norfolk Regiment, Norwich
 7th Battalion, The Royal Norfolk Regiment, King's Lynn
Division Royal Artillery
 Headquarters, Royal Artillery, The Barracks, Hertford
 85th (East Anglian) Field Regiment, Royal Artillery, Stratford
 86th (East Anglian) (Hertfordshire Yeomanry) Field Regiment, Royal Artillery, Hertford
 134th Field Regiment, Royal Artillery, Stratford
 55th (Suffolk Yeomanry) Anti-Tank Regiment, Royal Artillery, Bury St Edmunds
Divisional Royal Engineers
 Headquarters, Royal Engineers, Bedford
 249th (East Anglia) Field Company, Royal Engineers, Luton
 286th Field Company, Royal Engineers, Bedford
 289th Field Park Company, Royal Engineers, Luton

Chatham Area 
Chatham Area covered the areas of: Foulness Point (Essex) by a line drawn south to Shellness (Kent) thence a line drawn south-west to Ladydane thence along a road to Watling Street thence Watling Street to road Faversham, Leaveland, Challock Lees, Chaning, Lenham, Harrietsham, Elsfield, Hollingbourne thence Pilgrim's Way via Detling, Burham, Snodland thence via Pilgrim's Road to Trosley Towers thence along road Wrotham-Gravesent to Northumberland Bottom thence Watling Street to Southern Railway Bridge at Springhead thence northward along stream to River Thames, along south bank of River Thames to lighthouse on Swanscombe Marshes thence by a line drawn northeast across the River Thames to Grays Thurrock Station (Essex) thence along the main road to Stanford-le-Hope thence northside of railway via South Benfleet to Southend Borough boundary thence a line drawn northeast to lower Edward's Hull thence along road Eastwood to Harp House thence a line drawn south-east to Southchurch Lawn thence a line due north to River Roach, along south bank of River Roach and south bank of River Crouch to Foulness Point.

 Headquarters, Chatham Area, Kitchener Barracks under Area Commander Major General Ridley Pakenham Pakenham-Walsh
 Thames and Medway Heavy Regiment, Royal Artillery, Rochester
 Training Battalion, Royal Engineers, Royal School of Military Engineering
 Depot Battalion, Royal Engineers, Royal School of Military Engineering

Home Counties Area 
Home Counties Area covered the areas of: Woolwich (exclusive of Territorial Army troops in London District), Counties of Kent (less areas in Chatham Area and the 4th Infantry Division stations of Dover, Shorncliffe, Hythe and Lydd), Sussex, Surrey (less the eastern boundaries of the parishes of Chobham, Horsell and Woking through Woking) including portions of the parishes of Stoke-next-Guildford, St. Nicholas, Arlington, to the west of the railway.

 Headquarters, Home Counties Area, Woolwich Station under Area Commanded Brigadier Alastair Ian Macdougall
 Queen's Royal West Surrey Regiment Depot, Stoughton Barracks
 Royal East Kent Regiment (Buffs) Depot, Canterbury Barracks
 City of London Regiment (Royal Fusiliers) Depot, Hounslow Barracks
 East Surrey Regiment Depot, The Barracks, Kingston upon Thames
 Royal Sussex Regiment Depot, The Barracks, Chichester
 Queen's Own Royal West Kent Regiment Depot, Maidstone Barracks
 97th (Kent Yeomanry) Field Regiment, Royal Artillery (TA), Maidstone
 98th (Surrey and Sussex Yeomanry, Queen Mary's) Field Regiment, Royal Artillery (TA), Clapham Park
 143rd (Kent Yeomanry) Field Regiment, Royal Artillery (TA), Ashford
 144th (Surrey and Sussex Yeomanry, Queen Mary's) Field Regiment, Royal Artillery (TA), Chichester
 Kent and Sussex Heavy Regiment, Royal Artillery (TA), Dover
 Royal Artillery Depot, Royal Artillery Barracks, Woolwich
 Kent Fortress Engineers, Royal Engineers (TA), Dover
 Cinque Ports Fortress Engineers, Royal Engineers (TA), Northfleet
 21st Army Tank Brigade (TA), only part, other regiment under Southern Command
 Headquarters, 21st Army Tank Brigade, Chipperfield
 42nd (7th (23rd London) Battalion, The East Surrey Regiment) Royal Tank Regiment, St John's Hill
 48th (2/7th (23rd London) Battalion, The East Surrey Regiment) Royal Tank Regiment, Clapham
44th (6th Battalion, Gloucestershire Regiment) Royal Tank Regiment, Bristol

12th (Eastern) Infantry Division 

 12th (Eastern) Infantry Division (TA), Royal Artillery Barracks, Woolwich
 Headquarters, 12th Infantry Division commanded by Major General Roderic Loraine Petre
 12th (Eastern) Infantry Divisional Signals, Royal Corps of Signals, Stamford Brook
12th Infantry Divisional Royal Army Service Corps, Stamford Brook
 12th Infantry Divisional Royal Army Ordnance Corps, Stamford Brook
 12th Infantry Divisional Royal Army Medical Corps, Stamford Brook
 12th Infantry Divisional Military Police Company, Corps of Military Police, Stamford Brook
35th Infantry Brigade
 Headquarters, 35th Infantry Brigade & Signal Section, Royal Corps of Signals, Caxton Street
 2/5th Battalion, The Queen's Royal West Surrey Regiment, Woking
 2/6th (Bermondsey) Battalion, The Queen's Royal West Surrey Regiment, Richmond
 2/7th (Southwark) Battalion, The Queen's Royal West Surrey Regiment, St George's Market
36th Infantry Brigade
 Headquarters, 36th Infantry & Signal Section, Royal Corps of Signals, Victoria Street
 2/6th Battalion, The East Surrey Regiment, Richmond
 6th Battalion, The Queen's Own Royal West Kent Regiment, St Mary Cray
 7th Battalion, The Queen's Own Royal West Kent Regiment, Dartford
37th Infantry Brigade (Doubling as HQ Eastern Sub-Area)
 Headquarters, 37th Infantry & Signal Section, Royal Corps of Signals
 5th Battalion, The Royal East Kent Regiment (Buffs), Canterbury
 6th Battalion, The Royal Sussex Regiment, Worthing
 7th (Cinque Ports) Battalion, The Royal Sussex Regiment, Brighton
Divisional Royal Artillery
Headquarters, Divisional Royal Artillery, Royal Artillery Barracks, Woolwich
113th Field Regiment, Royal Artillery, Shoreham-by-Sea
114th Field Regiment, Royal Artillery, Bexhill-on-Sea
118th Field Regiment, Royal Artillery, Plumstead
67th Anti-Tank Regiment, Royal Artillery, Sutton
Divisional Royal Engineers
Headquarters, Divisional Royal Engineers, Brighton
262nd Field Company, Royal Engineers, Hastings
263rd Field Company, Royal Engineers, Eastbourne
264th Field Company, Royal Engineers, Lewes
265th Field Park Company, Royal Engineers, Eastbourne

44th (Home Counties) Infantry Division 

 44th (Home Counties) Infantry Division (TA)
 Headquarters, 44th Infantry Division, Royal Artillery Barracks, Woolwich commanded by Major General Edmund Archibald Osborne
 44th (Home Counties) Divisional Signals, Royal Corps of Signals, Stamford Brook
44th Infantry Divisional Royal Army Service Corps, Royal Artillery Barracks, Woolwich
 44th Infantry Divisional Royal Army Ordnance Corps, Royal Artillery Barracks, Woolwich
 44th Infantry Divisional Royal Army Medical Corps, Royal Artillery Barracks, Woolwich
 44th Infantry Divisional Military Police Company, Corps of Military Police, Royal Artillery Barracks, Woolwich
131st (Surrey) Infantry Brigade (Doubling as HQ Western Sub-Area)
 Headquarters, 131st Infantry & Signal Section, Royal Corps of Signals, Caxton Street
 1/5th Battalion, The Queen's Royal West Surrey Regiment, Guildford
 1/6th (Bermondsey) Battalion, The Queen's Royal West Surrey Regiment, Bermondsey
 1/7th (Southwark) Battalion, The Queen's Royal West Surrey Regiment, Walworth
132nd Infantry Brigade (Doubling as HQ Central Sub-Area)
 Headquarters, 132nd Infantry & Signal Section, Royal Corps of Signals, Victoria Street
 1/6th Battalion, The East Surrey Regiment, Surbiton
 4th Battalion, The Queen's Own Royal West Kent Regiment, Tonbridge
 5th Battalion, The Queen's Own Royal West Kent Regiment, Bromley
133rd (Kent and Sussex) Infantry Brigade (Doubling as HQ Eastern Sub-Area)
 Headquarters, 133rd Infantry & Signal Section, Royal Corps of Signals
 4th Battalion, The Royal East Kent Regiment (Buffs), Canterbury
 4th Battalion, The Royal Sussex Regiment, Horsham
 5th (Cinque Ports) Battalion, The Royal Sussex Regiment, Hastings
Divisional Royal Artillery
 Headquarters, Divisional Royal Artillery, Royal Artillery Barracks, Woolwich
 57th (Home Counties) Field Regiment, Royal Artillery, Brighton
 58th (Sussex) Field Regiment, Royal Artillery, Eastbourne
 65th (8th London) Field Regiment, Royal Artillery, Lee Green
 57th (East Surrey) Anti-Tank Regiment, Royal Artillery, Wimbledon
Divisional Royal Engineers
 Headquarters, Divisional Royal Engineers, Brighton
 208th (Sussex) Field Company, Royal Engineers, Eastbourne
 209th (Sussex) Field Company, Royal Engineers, Brighton
 210th (Sussex) Field Company, Royal Engineers, Seaford
 211th (Sussex) Field Company, Royal Engineers, Worthing

Northern Ireland District 
Northern Ireland District was one of two army districts, tasked with covering all of Northern Ireland.

 Headquarters, Northern Ireland District, Victoria Barracks under Major General Robert Valentine Pollock
 Northern Ireland District Pay Officer, Royal Army Pay Corps, Victoria Barracks
 Northern Ireland District Signal Company, Royal Corps of Signals, Victoria Barracks
 North Irish Horse (SR), Belfast
 2nd Battalion, The South Wales Borderers, Ebrington Barracks
 1st Battalion, The East Lancashire Regiment, Palace Barracks
 2nd Battalion, The Northamptonshire Regiment, Abercorn Barracks
 2nd Battalion, The Royal Sussex Regiment, Victoria Barracks
 Royal Inniskilling Fusiliers Depot, St Lucia Barracks
 Royal Ulster Rifles Depot, Gough Barracks
 Antrim Fortress Engineers, Royal Engineers (TA), Belfast
 26th Company, Royal Army Service Corps, Victoria Barracks
 53rd Company, Royal Army Service Corps, Victoria Barracks
 54th Company, Royal Army Service Corps, Ebrington Barracks
 Northern Ireland District Section, Royal Army Ordnance Corps, Kinnegar Army Barracks
 15th Company, Royal Army Medical Corps, Palace Barracks
 District Royal Artillery
 Headquarters, Royal Artillery, Victoria Barracks
 Belfast Fire Command, Belfast
 188th (Antrim) Independent Heavy Battery, Royal Artillery, Belfast
 3rd (Northern Ireland) Anti-Aircraft Brigade (SR)
 Headquarters, 3rd AA Brigade, Belfast
 3rd (Ulster) Searchlight Regiment, Royal Artillery, Belfast
 8th (Belfast) Anti-Aircraft Regiment, Royal Artillery, Belfast
 9th (Londonderry) Anti-Aircraft Regiment, Royal Artillery, Derry

Western Command 
Western Command was the largest command by area covered, including: Wales and the Counties of Cumberland, Westmorland, Lancashire, Staffordshire, Shropshire, Herefordshire, Cheshire, and Beachley, Gloucestershire, and The Isle of Man.

 Headquarters, Western Command based at Dale Barracks 'The Dale' under Lieutenant General Robert Hadden Haining
 Western Command Pay Detachment, Royal Army Pay Corps, Chester
 Western Command Pay Detachment, Royal Army Pay Corps, Preston
 Western Command Pay Detachment, Royal Army Pay Corps, Shrewsbury
 Western Command Signals, Royal Corps of Signals, The Dale
 1st (East Lancashire) Corps Medium Artillery Signal Section, Royal Corps of Signals (SR), Manchester
 2nd Lines of Communications Signal Section, Royal Corps of Signals (SR), Manchester
 3rd (West Lancashire) Lines of Communications Signal Section, Royal Corps of Signals (SR), Liverpool
 2nd Battalion, The Royal East Kent Regiment (Buffs), Defensible Barracks
 100th (Monmouthshire) Army Troops Company, Royal Engineers (SR), Monmouth Castle
 101st (Monmouthshire) Army Troops Company, Royal Engineers (SR), Monmouth Castle
 104th (East Lancashire) Army Troops Company, Royal Engineers (SR), Manchester
 105th (West Lancashire) Army Troops Company, Royal Engineers (SR), Liverpool
 154th (Great Western) Railway Operating Company, Royal Engineers (SR), Newport
 16th Company, Royal Army Service Corps, Preston
 I Company, Royal Army Service Corps, Chester
 10th Section, Royal Army Ordnance Corps, Burscough
 19th Company, Royal Army Medical Corps, Warrington
 2nd Anti-Aircraft Brigade
 Headquarters, 2nd Anti-Aircraft Brigade, Lichfield
 2nd Anti-Aircraft Brigade Signals, Royal Corps of Signals, Blackdown
 1st Anti-Aircraft Regiment, Royal Artillery, Lichfield
 2nd Anti-Aircraft Regiment, Royal Artillery, Lichfield
 Royal Artillery Fixed Defences, North-Western Ports
 Headquarters, Fixed Defences, Liverpool
 Mersey Fire Command, Liverpool
 Royal Artillery Fixed Defences, Welsh Ports
 Headquarters, Fixed Defences, Pembroke
 Milford Haven Fire Command, Pembroke
 Severn Fire Command, Barry Island

Welsh Area 
Welsh Area covered Wales and the Countries of Shropshire and Herefordshire, and Beachley (Glouchestershire).

 Welsh Area Headquarters, Copthorne Barracks
 Shropshire Yeomanry (TA), Shrewsbury
 Royal Welch Fusiliers Depot, Hightown Barracks
 South Wales Borderers Depot, The Barracks, Brecon
 Welch Regiment Depot, Maindy Barracks
 King's Shropshire Light Infantry Depot, Copthorne Barracks
 6th Medium Regiment, Royal Artillery, 
 69th (Caernarvon & Denbigh Yeomanry) Medium Regiment, Royal Artillery (TA), Bangor
 70th (Royal Welch Fusiliers) Anti-Tank Regiment, Royal Artillery (TA), Mold
 20th Light Anti-Aircraft Regiment, Royal Artillery (TA), Cardiff
 3rd Field Depot, Royal Artillery, Park Hall Barracks
 4th Field Depot, Royal Artillery, Kinmel Camp
 10th Anti-Aircraft Depot, Royal Artillery, Park Hall Barracks
 11th Anti-Aircraft Depot, Royal Artillery, Park Hall Barracks
 15th Searchlight Depot, Royal Artillery, Park Hall Barracks
 16th Searchlight Depot, Royal Artillery, Kinmel Camp
 17th Searchlight Depot, Royal Artillery, RAF Credenhill
 246th (Welsh) Field Company, Royal Engineers (TA), Cardiff
 Welsh Area Coast Defences
 Glamorgan Heavy Regiment, Royal Artillery, Cardiff
 Pembrokeshire Heavy Regiment, Royal Artillery, Milford Haven
 Glamorgan Fortress Engineers, Royal Engineers, Cardiff
 Carmarthenshire Fortress Engineers, Royal Engineers, Llanelli

38th (Welsh) Infantry Division (2/TA) 

 38th (Welsh) Infantry Division, Shrewsbury
 Headquarters, 38th Infantry Division commanded by Major General Geoffrey Taunton Raikes
 38th (Welsh) Divisional Signals, Royal Corps of Signals, Cardiff
38th Infantry Divisional Royal Army Service Corps, Cardiff
 38th Infantry Divisional Royal Army Ordnance Corps, Shrewsbury
 38th Infantry Divisional Royal Army Medical Corps, Shrewsbury
 38th Infantry Divisional Military Police Company, Corps of Military Police, Shrewsbury
113th (South Wales) Infantry Brigade
 Headquarters, 113th Infantry Brigade & Signal Section, Royal Corps of Signals, Cardiff
 15th (Carmarthanshire) Battalion, The Welch Regiment, Llanelli
 2/5th Battalion, The Welch Regiment, Swansea
 4th Battalion, The Monmouthshire Regiment, Newport
114th (Welsh Border) Infantry Brigade
 Headquarters, 114th Infantry Brigade & Signal Section, Royal Corps of Signals, Newport
 5th Battalion, The King's Shropshire Light Infantry, Ross-on-Wye
 The Brecknockshire Battalion, The South Wales Borderers, Brecon
 2nd Battalion, The Herefordshire Light Infantry, Hereford
115th (Royal Welch Fusiliers) Brigade
 Headquarters, 115th Infantry Brigade & Signal Section, Royal Corps of Signals, Wrexham
 8th Battalion, The Royal Welch Fusiliers, Wrexham
 9th Battalion, The Royal Welch Fusiliers, Conwy
 10th Battalion, The Royal Welch Fusiliers, Newtown
Divisional Royal Artillery
 Headquarters, Divisional Royal Artillery, Shrewsbury
 102nd (Pembroke & Cardiganshire) Field Regiment, Royal Artillery, Pembroke Dock
 132nd Field Regiment, Royal Artillery, Neath
 146th Field Regiment, Royal Artillery, Aberystwyth
Divisional Royal Engineers
 Headquarters, Divisional Royal Engineers, Cardiff
 283rd Field Company, Royal Engineers, Barry
 284th Field Company, Royal Engineers, Cardiff
 247th (Welsh) Field Park Company, Royal Engineers, Gorseinon

53rd (Welsh) Infantry Division (1/TA) 

 53rd (Welsh) Infantry Division, Shrewsbury
 Headquarters, 53rd Infantry Division commanded by Major General Bevil Thomson Wilson
 53rd (Welsh) Divisional Signals, Royal Corps of Signals, Cardiff
53rd Infantry Divisional Royal Army Service Corps, Shrewsbury
 53rd Infantry Divisional Royal Army Ordnance Corps, Shrewsbury
 53rd Infantry Divisional Royal Army Medical Corps, Shrewsbury
 53rd Infantry Divisional Military Police Company, Corps of Military Police, Shrewsbury
158th (Royal Welch Fusiliers) Infantry Brigade
 Headquarters, 158th Infantry Brigade & Signal Section, Royal Corps of Signals, Wrexham
 4th (Denbigh) Battalion, The Royal Welch Fusiliers, Wrexham
 6th (Carnarvon and Angesley) Battalion, The Royal Welch Fusiliers, Caernarfon
 7th (Merioneth and Montgomery) Battalion, The Royal Welch Fusiliers, Newtown
159th (Welsh Border) Infantry Brigade
 Headquarters, 159th Infantry Brigade & Signal Section, Royal Corps of Signals, Newport
 4th Battalion, The King's Shropshire Light Infantry, Shrewsbury
 3rd Battalion, The Monmouthshire Regiment, Abergavenny
 1st Battalion, The Herefordshire Light Infantry, Hereford
160th (South Wales) Infantry Brigade
 Headquarters, 160th Infantry Brigade & Signal Section, Royal Corps of Signals, Cardiff
 4th (Llanelli) Battalion, The Welch Regiment, Llanelli
 1/5th (Glamorgan) Battalion, The Welch Regiment, Pontypridd
 2nd Battalion, The Monmouthshire Regiment, Pontypool
Divisional Royal Artillery
 Headquarters, Divisional Royal Artillery, Shrewsbury
 81st (Welsh) Field Regiment, Royal Artillery, Port Talbot
 83rd (Welsh) Field Regiment, Royal Artillery, Newport
 133rd Field Regiment, Royal Artillery, Griffithstown
 60th (Royal Welch Fusiliers) Anti-Tank Regiment, Royal Artillery, Flint
Divisional Royal Engineers
 Headquarters, Divisional Royal Engineers, Swansea
 244th (Welsh) Field Company, Royal Engineers, Swansea
 245th (Welsh) Field Company, Royal Engineers, Neath
 282nd Field Company, Royal Engineers, Port Talbot
 285th Field Park Company, Royal Engineers, Gorseinon

West Lancashire Area 
West Lancashire encompassed: Lancashire, south and west of a line along the River Douglas and the Leeds-Liverpool Canal, South-East to Worsley, Cheshire, and Staffordshire.

 Headquarters, West Lancashire Area, Preston under Brigadier William Havelock Ramsden
 4th Battalion, The Cheshire Regiment, Chester (TA), machine-gun battalion
 5th (Earl of Chester's) Battalion, The Cheshire Regiment (TA), Knutsford, machine-gun battalion
 6th Battalion, The Cheshire Regiment (TA), Stockport, machine-gun battalion
 7th Battalion, The Cheshire Regiment (TA), Macclesfield, machine-gun battalion
 King's Liverpool Regiment Depot, Seaforth Barracks
 Cheshire Regiment Depot, Chester Castle
 South Staffordshire Regiment Depot, Whittington Barracks
 The Prince of Wales's South Lancashire Volunteers Depot, Peninsula Barracks
 The Prince of Wales's North Staffordshire Regiment Depot, Whittington Barracks
 106th (Lancashire Hussars) Field Regiment, Royal Horse Artillery (TA), Liverpool
 149th (Lancashire Hussars) Field Regiment, Royal Horse Artillery (TA), Hoylake
 88th (2nd West Lancashire) Field Regiment, Royal Artillery (TA), Preston
 137th (2nd West Lancashire) Field Regiment, Royal Artillery (TA), Blackpool
 51st (Midland) Medium Regiment, Royal Artillery (TA), Stoke-on-Trent
 59th (4th West Lancashire) Medium Regiment, Royal Artillery (TA), Liverpool
 63rd (Midland) Medium Regiment, Royal Artillery (TA), Stoke-on-Trent
 68th (4th West Lancashire) Medium Regiment, Royal Artillery (TA), Liverpool
 135th Light Anti-Aircraft Battery, Royal Artillery (TA), Weaver Junction
 12th Anti-Aircraft Depot, Royal Artillery, Saighton Camp
 18th Searchlight Depot, Royal Artillery, Saighton Camp
Mobile Divisional Royal Engineer
Headquarters, Mobile Divisional Royal Engineers, Liverpool
2nd (Cheshire) Field Squadron, Royal Engineers, Birkenhead
3rd (Cheshire) Field Squadron, Royal Engineers, Wallasey
141st Field Park Troop, Royal Engineers, Liverpool
142nd Field Park Troop, Royal Engineers, Liverpool
 213th (North Midland) Army Field Company, Royal Engineers (TA), Cannock
 214th (North Midland) Army Field Company, Royal Engineers (TA), Tunstall
 252nd (West Lancashire) Field Company, Royal Engineers (TA), Walsall
 253rd (West Lancashire) Field Company, Royal Engineers (TA), St Helens
 254th (West Lancashire) Field Park Company, Royal Engineers (TA), Liverpool
 290th Field Company, Royal Engineers (TA), Rowley Regis
 291st Field Company, Royal Engineers (TA), Walsall
 292nd Field Company, Royal Engineers (TA), The Potteries
 293rd Field Park Company, Royal Engineers (TA), Stafford
 6th Cavalry Brigade (TA)
 Headquarters, 6th Cavalry Brigade, Leicester
 The Earl of Chester's Cheshire Yeomanry, Chester
 The Queen's Own Royal Staffordshire Yeomanry Regiment, Stafford
Warwickshire, Warwick
 23rd Army Tank Brigade (2/TA)
 Headquarters, 23rd Army Tank Brigade, Liverpool
 40th (The King's) Royal Tank Regiment, Liverpool
 46th (Liverpool Welsh) Royal Tank Regiment, Liverpool
50th (2/6th Battalion Gloucestershire Regiment) Royal Tank Regiment, Bristol
 West Lancashire Area Coastal Defences
 Lancashire and Cheshire Heavy Regiment, Royal Artillery (TA), Liverpool
 Lancashire Fortress Engineers, Royal Engineers (TA), Liverpool

55th (West Lancashire) Motor Division (TA) 

 55th (West Lancashire) Infantry Division, Liverpool
 Headquarters, 55th Motor Division commanded by Major General Vivian Henry Bruce Majendie
 55th (West Lancashire) Divisional Signals, Royal Corps of Signals, Liverpool
 5th Battalion, The Loyal North Lancashire Regiment, Bolton, motorcycle reconnaissance
55th Infantry Divisional Royal Army Service Corps, Liverpool
 55th Infantry Divisional Royal Army Ordnance Corps, Liverpool
 55th Infantry Divisional Royal Army Medical Corps, Liverpool
 55th Infantry Divisional Military Police Company, Corps of Military Police, Liverpool
164th Infantry Brigade, all units motor infantry
 Headquarters, 164th Infantry Brigade & Signal Section, Royal Corps of Signals, Warrington
 9th Battalion, The King's Liverpool Regiment, Liverpool
 1/4th Battalion, The Prince of Wales's South Lancashire Volunteers, Warrington
 2/4th Battalion, The Prince of Wales's South Lancashire Volunteers, Warrington
165th Infantry Brigade, all units motor infantry
 Headquarters, 165th Infantry Brigade & Signal Section, Royal Corps of Signals, Liverpool
 5th Battalion, The King's Liverpool Regiment, Liverpool
 1st Battalion, The Liverpool Scottish, Liverpool
 2nd Battalion, The Liverpool Scottish, Liverpool
Divisional Royal Artillery
 Headquarters, Divisional Royal Artillery, Liverpool
 87th (1st West Lancashire) Field Regiment, Royal Artillery, Liverpool
 136th Field Regiment, Royal Artillery, Liverpool
 66th Anti-Tank Regiment, Royal Artillery, Crosby
Divisional Royal Engineers
 Headquarters, Divisional Engineers, Aigburth
 509th Field Company, Royal Engineers, Liverpool
 510th Field Company, Royal Engineers, Liverpool
 511th Field Park Company, Royal Engineers, Liverpool

59th (Staffordshire) Motor Division (2/TA) 

 59th (Staffordshire) Motor Division, Stafford
 Headquarters, 59th Motor Division commanded by Major General John Blakiston-Houston
 59th (Staffordshire) Divisional Signals, Royal Corps of Signals, Stafford
 6th Battalion, The Loyal North Lancashire Regiment, Bolton, motorcycle reconnaissance
59th Infantry Divisional Royal Army Service Corps, Stafford
 59th Infantry Divisional Royal Army Ordnance Corps, Stafford
 59th Infantry Divisional Royal Army Medical Corps, Stafford
 59th Infantry Divisional Military Police Company, Corps of Military Police, Stafford
176th Infantry Brigade
 Headquarters, 176th Infantry Brigade & Signal Section, Royal Corps of Signals, Burton upon Trent
 7th Battalion, The South Staffordshire Regiment, Brownhills
 6th Battalion, The Prince of Wales's North Staffordshire Regiment, Burton upon Trent
 7th Battalion, The Prince of Wales's North Staffordshire Regiment, Burton upon Trent
177th Infantry Brigade
 Headquarters, 177th Infantry Brigade & Signal Section, Royal Corps of Signals, Stafford
 5th Battalion, The South Staffordshire Regiment, Walsall
 1/6th Battalion, The South Staffordshire Regiment, Wolverhampton
 2/6th Battalion, The South Staffordshire Regiment, Bilston
Divisional Royal Artillery
 Headquarters, Divisional Royal Artillery
 61st (North Midland) Field Regiment, Royal Artillery, Stoke-on-Trent
 116th Field Regiment, Royal Artillery, Hanley
Divisional Royal Engineers (cadre, not formed yet)

East Lancashire Area 
East Lancashire Area comprised the areas of: Cumberland, Westmoreland and that part of Lancashire not included in West Lancashire Area.

 Headquarters, East Lancashire Area, Manchester under Brigadier General Cecil Francis Drew
 The Duke of Lancaster's Own Yeomanry (TA), Manchester
 1/9th Battalion, The Manchester Regiment (TA), Ashton-under-Lyne, machine-gun battalion
 2/9th Battalion, The Manchester Regiment (TA), Audenshaw, machine-gun battalion
 King’s Own Lancaster Regiment Depot, Bowerham Barracks
 Lancashire Fusiliers Depot, Wellington Barracks
 East Lancashire Regiment Depot, Burnley Barracks
 Border Regiment Depot, Carlisle Castle
 Loyal North Lancashire Regiment Depot, Fulwood Barracks
 Manchester Regiment Depot, Ladysmith Barracks
 52nd (East Lancashire) Light Anti-Aircraft Regiment, Royal Artillery (TA), Burnley
 56th (East Lancashire) Light Anti-Aircraft Regiment, Royal Artillery (TA), Oswaldtwistle
 134th Light Anti-Aircraft Battery, Royal Artillery (TA), RAF Great Orton
 13th Anti-Aircraft Depot, Royal Artillery, Carlisle Castle Barracks
 23rd Searchlight Depot, Royal Artillery Carlisle Castle Barracks
 275th Field Company, Royal Engineers (TA), Manchester
 24th Army Tank Brigade (2/TA)
 Headquarters, 24th Army Tank Brigade, Leeds
 41st (Oldham) Royal Tank Regiment, Oldham
 45th (Leeds Rifles) Royal Tank Regiment, Leeds
 47th (Oldham) Royal Tank Regiment, Oldham

42nd (East Lancashire) Infantry Division (TA) 

 42nd (East Lancashire) Infantry Division, Manchester
 Headquarters, 42nd Infantry Division commanded by Major General William George Holmes
 42nd (East Lancashire) Divisional Signals, Royal Corps of Signals, Manchester
42nd Infantry Divisional Royal Army Service Corps, Manchester
 42nd Infantry Divisional Royal Army Ordnance Corps, Manchester
 42nd Infantry Divisional Royal Army Medical Corps, Manchester
 42nd Infantry Divisional Military Police Company, Corps of Military Police, Manchester
125th (Lancashire Fusiliers) Infantry Brigade
 Headquarters, 125th Infantry Brigade & Signal Section, Royal Corps of Signals, Bury
 1/5th Battalion, Lancashire Fusiliers, Bury
 1/6th Battalion, Lancashire Fusiliers, Rochdale
 1/8th Battalion, Lancashire Fusiliers, Salford
126th Infantry Brigade
 Headquarters, 126th Infantry Brigade & Signal Section, Royal Corps of Signals, Carlisle
 5th Battalion, The King's Own Royal Lancaster Regiment, Lancaster
 4th (Westmoreland) Battalion, The Border Regiment, Kendal
 5th (Cumberland) Battalion, The Border Regiment, Workington
127th (Manchester) Infantry Brigade
 Headquarters, 127th Infantry Brigade & Signal Section, Royal Corps of Signals, Ashton-under-Lyne
 4th Battalion, The East Lancashire Regiment, Blackburn
 5th Battalion, The Manchester Regiment, Wigan
 8th (Ardwick) Battalion, The Manchester Regiment, Ardwick
Divisional Royal Artillery
 Headquarters, Divisional Royal Artillery, Whalley Range
 51st (Westmorland and Cumberland Yeomanry) Field Regiment, Royal Artillery, Carlisle
 52nd (Manchester) Field Regiment, Royal Artillery, Manchester
 53rd (Bolton) Field Regiment, Royal Artillery, Bolton
 56th (King's Own) Anti-Tank Regiment, Royal Artillery, Manchester
Divisional Royal Engineers
 Headquarters, Divisional Royal Engineers, Manchester
 200th (East Lancashire) Field Company, Royal Engineers, Manchester
 201st (East Lancashire) Field Company, Royal Engineers, Manchester
 202nd (East Lancashire) Field Company, Royal Engineers, Manchester
 203rd (East Lancashire) Field Park Company, Royal Engineers, Smethwick

66th (2nd East Lancashire) Infantry Division (2/TA) 

 66th (2nd East Lancashire) Infantry Division, Manchester
 Headquarters, 66th Infantry Division commanded by Major General Arthur William Purser
 66th Divisional Signals, Royal Corps of Signals, Manchester
66th Infantry Divisional Royal Army Service Corps, Manchester
 66th Infantry Divisional Royal Army Ordnance Corps, Manchester
 66th Infantry Divisional Royal Army Medical Corps, Manchester
 66th Infantry Divisional Military Police Company, Corps of Military Police, Manchester 
197th Infantry Brigade
 Headquarters, 197th Infantry Brigade & Signal Section, Royal Corps of Signals, Bury
 2/5th Battalion, Lancashire Fusiliers, Bury
 2/6th Battalion, Lancashire Fusiliers, Middleton
 5th Battalion, The East Lancashire Regiment, Burnley
198th Infantry Brigade
 Headquarters, 198th Infantry Brigade & Signal Section, Royal Corps of Signals, Carlisle
 8th (Liverpool Irish) Battalion, The King's Liverpool Regiment, Liverpool
 6th (East Cumberland) Battalion, The Border Regiment, Carlisle
 7th (Cumberland) Battalion, The Border Regiment, Whitehaven
199th Infantry Brigade
 Headquarters, 199th Infantry Brigade & Signal Section, Royal Corps of Signals, Ashton-under-Lyne
 2/8th Battalion, Lancashire Fusiliers, Kersal
 6th Battalion, The Manchester Regiment, Leigh
 7th Battalion, The Manchester Regiment, Didsbury
Divisional Royal Artillery
 Headquarters, Divisional Royal Artillery, Whalley Range
 109th Field Regiment, Royal Artillery, Workington
 110th Field Regiment, Royal Artillery, Manchester
 111th Field Regiment, Royal Artillery, Bolton
Divisional Royal Engineers
 Headquarters, Divisional Royal Engineers, Manchester
 255th Field Company, Royal Engineers, Manchester
 256th Field Company, Royal Engineers, Manchester
 258th Field Park Company, Royal Engineers, Manchester

London District 
London District comprises County of London, Warley Barracks (Foot Guards only), Rainham Rifle Range, Purfleet, Woolwich (for Territorial Army Troops), Caterham Barracks, Pirbright, and (for regular troops) Combermere Barracks and Victoria Barracks.

 Headquarters, London District, Horse Guards commanded by Major-General Commanding the Brigade of Guards and General Officer Commanding London District Sir Andrew Thorne
 London District Pay Detachment, Royal Army Pay Corps, Deptford
 London District Pay Detachment, Royal Army Pay Corps, Regent's Park Barracks
 Lines of Communications Signals, Royal Corps of Signals (SR)
 Headquarters, Lines of Communications Signals, Clapham Park
 1st (City of London) Lines of Communications Signals Section, Royal Corps of Signals (SR), Clapham
 4th (City of London) Lines of Communications Signals Section, Royal Corps of Signals (SR), London
 London District Signals, Royal Corps of Signals (TA), London
 London Corps Signals, Royal Corps of Signals (TA), Putney Bridge
 Mobile Divisional Signals (The Duke of Cambridge's Middlesex Hussars Yeomanry), Royal Corps of Signals (TA), Chelsea
 2nd (London) Air Formation Signals, Royal Corps of Signals (SR), Putney Bridge
 2nd (8th London) Construction Section, Royal Corps of Signals (SR), London
 2nd (9th London) Construction Section, Royal Corps of Signals (SR), London
 3rd (London) Construction Section, Royal Corps of Signals (SR), London
 Life Guards, Hyde Park Barracks
 Royal Horse Guards (The Blues), Combermere Barracks
 1st Battalion, Scots Guards, Chelsea Barracks
 1st Battalion, Irish Guards, Wellington Barracks
 2nd Battalion, Irish Guards, Wellington Barracks
 Guards Depot, Caterham Barracks
 5th Infantry Training Group, Pirbright
 11th (Honourable Artillery Company) Regiment, Royal Horse Artillery, Finsbury Barracks
 12th (Honourable Artillery Company) Regiment, Royal Horse Artillery, Finsbury Barracks
 91st (4th London) Field Regiment, Royal Artillery (TA), Lewisham
 92nd (5th London) Field Regiment, Royal Artillery (TA), Kennington Lane
 139th Field Regiment, Royal Artillery (TA), Lewisham
 140th Field Regiment, Royal Artillery (TA), Clapham Common
 53rd (London) Medium Regiment, Royal Artillery (TA), Barnsbury
 64th Medium Regiment, Royal Artillery (TA), Barnsbury
 52nd (6th London) Anti-Tank Regiment, Royal Artillery (TA) Brixton
 62nd Anti-Tank Regiment, Royal Artillery (TA), Stockwell
 K Battery, Royal Horse Artillery, St John's Wood (The Riding Troop, Royal Horse Artillery)
 Railway Stores Group, Royal Engineers (SR)
 Headquarters, Railway Stores Group, Lambeth
 156th (Southern) Transit Stores Company, Royal Engineers (SR), Lambeth
 216th (1st London) Field Company, Royal Engineers (TA), Bethnal Green
 217th (1st London) Field Company, Royal Engineers (TA), Bethnal Green
 218th (1st London) Field Company, Royal Engineers (TA), Bethnal Green
 219th (1st London) Field Park Company, Royal Engineers (TA), Bethnal Green
 221st (2nd London) Field Company, Royal Engineers (TA), Chelsea
 222nd (2nd London) Field Company, Royal Engineers (TA), Chelsea
 294th Field Company, Royal Engineers (TA), Barnet
 295th Field Company, Royal Engineers (TA), Barnet
 296th Field Company, Royal Engineers (TA), Barnet
 297th Field Park Company, Royal Engineers (TA), Barnet
 102nd (London) Army Troops Company, Royal Engineers (SR), Bethnal Green
 151st (Great Western) Railway Construction Company, Royal Engineers (SR), Paddington station
 152nd (Great Western) Railway Construction Company, Royal Engineers (SR), Paddington station
 Officers Producing Group
 Group Headquarters, RHQ Welsh Guards, Birdcage Walk
 102nd (Westminster Dragoons) Officer Cadet Training Unit (TA), Westminster
The Inns of Court Regiment (TA), Lincoln's Inn
Artists Rifles (TA), Finsbury
 1st Observation Post Section, 11th (Honourable Artillery Company) Regiment, Royal Horse Artillery (TA), Finsbury Barracks
 2nd Observation Post Section, 11th (Honourable Artillery Company) Regiment, Royal Horse Artillery (TA), Finsbury Barracks
 22nd Heavy Armoured Brigade (TA)
 Headquarters, 22nd Heavy Armoured Brigade, St John's Wood
 3rd County of London Yeomanry (Sharpshooters), St John's Wood
 4th County of London Yeomanry (Sharpshooters), St John's Wood
2nd Royal Gloucestershire Hussars, Bristol

1st London Motor Division (TA) 

 1st London Motor Division, Finsbury Barracks
 Headquarters, 1st London Motor Division commanded by Major General Claude Francis Liardet
1st (City of London) London Divisional Signals, Royal Corps of Signals, Clapham Park
 1st Battalion, Queen Victoria's Rifles, Davies Street, motorcycle reconnaissance
 1st London Infantry Brigade
 Headquarters, 1st London Infantry Brigade & Signal Section, Royal Corps of Signals, RHQ Grenadier Guards, Birdcage Walk
 8th (1st City of London) Battalion, The City of London Regiment (Royal Fusiliers), Bloomsbury
 9th (1st City of London) Battalion, The City of London Regiment (Royal Fusiliers), Balham
 1st Battalion, London Irish Rifles, Duke of York's Headquarters
 2nd London Infantry Brigade
 Headquarters, 2nd London Infantry Brigade & Signal Section, Royal Corps of Signals, Finsbury Barracks
 1st Battalion, London Rifle Brigade, London
 1st Battalion, London Scottish, Westminster
 1st Battalion, The Queen's Westminsters, Queen's Hall
 3rd London Infantry Brigade (attached for administrative purposes)
 Headquarters, 3rd London Infantry Brigade & Signal Section, Royal Corps of Signals, Tottenham Court Road
 1st London Rangers, Tottenham Court
 2nd London Rangers, Montague Street
 1st Tower Hamlet Rifles, Bow
 2nd Tower Hamlet Rifles, Bow
 Divisional Royal Artillery
 Headquarters, Divisional Royal Artillery, Finsbury Barracks
 64th (7th London) Field Regiment, Royal Artillery, Fulham
 90th (City of London) Field Regiment, Royal Artillery, Bloomsbury
 Divisional Royal Engineers
 Headquarters, Divisional Royal Engineers, Duke of York's Headquarters
 220th (2nd London) Field Company, Royal Engineers, Chelsea
 223rd (2nd London) Field Park Company, Royal Engineers, Chelsea

2nd London Motor Division (2/TA) 

 2nd London Motor Division, London
 Headquarters, 2nd London Motor Division commanded by Major General Harry Willans
 2nd (City of London) London Divisional Signals, Royal Corps of Signals, Clapham Park
 2nd Battalion, Queen Victoria's Rifles, Grosvenor, motorcycle reconnaissance
 4th London Infantry Brigade
 Headquarters, 4th London Infantry Brigade & Signal Section, Royal Corps of Signals, RHQ Grenadier Guards, Birdcage Walk
 11th Battalion, The City of London Regiment (Royal Fusiliers), Fusilier Hall, SW1
 12th Battalion, The City of London Regiment (Royal Fusiliers), Balham
 2nd Battalion, London Irish Rifles, Duke of York's Headquarters
 5th London Infantry Brigade
 Headquarters, 5th London Infantry Brigade & Signal Section, Royal Corps of Signals, Finsbury Barracks
 2nd Battalion, London Rifle Brigade, EC1
 2nd Battalion, London Scottish, Grosvenor
 2nd Battalion, Queen's Westminsters, Pinner
 6th London Infantry Brigade (attached for administrative purposes)
 Headquarters, 3rd London Infantry Brigade & Signal Section, Royal Corps of Signals, Tottenham Court Road
 1st Battalion, Princess Louise's Kensington Regiment, Hammersmith, machine-gun
 2nd Battalion, Princess Louise's Kensington Regiment, Hammersmith, machine-gun
Divisional Royal Artillery
Headquarters, Divisional Royal Artillery, Finsbury Barracks
117th Field Regiment, Royal Artillery, Fulham
138th Field Regiment, Royal Artillery, Finsbury Barracks
Divisional Royal Engineers
Headquarters, Divisional Royal Engineers, Duke of York's Headquarters
501st Field Company, Royal Engineers, Chelsea
502nd Field Company, Royal Engineers, New Barnet
503rd Field Company, Royal Engineers, New Barnet
504th Field Park Company, Royal Engineers, New Barnet

Southern Command 
Southern Command comprised: Counties of Warwickshire, Northamptonshire, Huntingdonshire, Buckinghamshire, Berkshire (except Victoria Barracks and Combermere Barracks and that portion of the county included in the Aldershot Command), Oxfordshire, Hampshire (except that portion included in the Aldershot Command), Wiltshire, Dorset, Devonshire, Cornwall, Somerset, Gloucestershire (expect Beachley) and Worcestershire.

 Headquarters, Southern Command, Bulford Barracks commanded by Lieutenant General Bertie Drew Fisher
 Southern Command Pay Detachment, Royal Army Pay Corps, Wyvern Barracks
 Southern Command Pay Detachment, Royal Army Pay Corps, Hilsea Barracks
 Southern Command Pay Detachment, Royal Army Pay Corps, Bulford Barracks
 Southern Command Pay Detachment, Royal Army Pay Corps, Budbrooke Barracks
 Southern Command Pay Detachment, Royal Army Pay Corps, Peninsula Barracks
 Southern Command Signals, Royal Corps of Signals, Bulford Barracks
 2nd Artillery Signal Section, Royal Corps of Signals, Bulford Barracks
 5th Artillery Signal Section, Royal Corps of Signals, Bulford Barracks
 7th Artillery Signal Section, Royal Corps of Signals, Bulford Barracks
 9th Artillery Signal Section, Royal Corps of Signals, Bulford Barracks
 2nd Artillery Signal Section, Royal Corps of Signals, Bulford Barracks
 4th Artillery Signal Section, Royal Corps of Signals, Bulford Barracks
 4th Air Formation Signals, Royal Corps of Signals (SR), Birmingham
 1st Wireless Section, Royal Corps of Signals (SR), Coventry
 2nd Wireless Section, Royal Corps of Signals (SR), Coventry
 1st Survey Regiment, Royal Artillery, Royal Artillery Barracks, Larkhill
 2nd Survey Regiment, Royal Artillery, Royal Artillery Barracks, Larkhill
 9th Field Regiment, Royal Artillery, Bulford Barracks
 3rd Medium Regiment, Royal Artillery, Royal Artillery Barracks, Larkhill
 4th Anti-Aircraft Regiment, Royal Artillery, Bulford Barracks
 2nd Searchlight Regiment, Royal Artillery, Clarence Barracks
 58th Chemical Warfare Company, Royal Engineers, Porton Down
 Detachment from The Survey Battalion, Royal Engineers, Horfield Barracks
 2nd Section, Royal Army Ordnance Corps, Bulford Barracks
 3rd Section, Royal Army Ordnance Corps, Bovington Camp
 4th Section, Royal Army Ordnance Corps, Vauxhall Barracks
 Corps Depot, Royal Army Ordnance Corps, Hilsea Barracks
 4th Company, Royal Army Medical Corps, Netley Hospital
 20th Company, Royal Army Ordnance Corps, Bulford Barracks
 Southern Command Veterinary Depot, Royal Army Veterinary Corps, Bulford Barracks

1st Armoured Division 

 1st Armoured Division, Priory Lodge, Andore
 Headquarters, 1st Armoured Division commanded by Major General Roger Evans
 1st Armoured Divisional Signals, Royal Corps of Signals, Bulford Barracks
 1st Armoured Divisional Royal Army Service Corps, Bulford Barracks
 1st Armoured Divisional Royal Army Ordnance Corps, Bulford Barracks
 1st Armoured Divisional Royal Army Medical Corps, Bulford Barracks
 1st Armoured Divisional Military Police Company, Corps of Military Police
 1st Light Armoured Brigade
 Headquarters, 1st Light Armoured Brigade & Signal Section, Royal Corps of Signals, Tidworth Barracks
 1st King's Dragoon Guards, Aldershot
 3rd The King's Own Hussars, Tidworth Barracks
 4th Queen's Own Hussars, Tidworth Barracks
 2nd Light Armoured Brigade
 Headquarters, 2nd Light Armoured Brigade & Signal Section, Royal Corps of Signals, Tidworth Barracks
 The Queen's Bays (2nd Dragoon Guards), Tidworth Barracks
 9th Queen's Royal Lancers, Tidworth Barracks
 10th Royal Hussars (Prince of Wales' Own), Tidworth Barracks
 1st Heavy Armoured Brigade
 Headquarters, 1st Heavy Armoured Brigade & Signal Section, Royal Corps of Signals, Perham Down
 2nd Royal Tank Regiment, Lille Barracks (Farnborough)
 3rd Royal Tank Regiment, Battlesbury Barracks
 5th Royal Tank Regiment, Perham Down
 1st Support Group
 Headquarters, 1st Support Group & Signal Section, Royal Corps of Signals, Tidworth Barracks
 2nd Battalion, The King's Royal Rifle Corps, Tidworth Barracks (mechanised infantry)
 1st Battalion, The Prince Consort's Own Rifle Brigade, Tidworth Barracks (mechanised infantry)
 1st Field Regiment, Royal Horse Artillery, Bulford Barracks
 2nd Field Regiment, Royal Horse Artillery, Bulford Barracks
 1st Support Group Anti-Tank Company
 Divisional Royal Engineers
 1st Field Squadron, Royal Engineers, Aldershot
 1st Field Park Troop, Royal Engineers, Tidworth Barracks
 1st Armoured Divisional Field Post, Royal Engineers, Bulford Barracks

3rd Infantry Division (Mixed) 

 3rd Infantry Division, Bulford Barracks - Division contained regular and 1st Line TA units
 Headquarters, 3rd Infantry Division commanded by Major General Bernard Law Montgomery
 3rd Infantry Divisional Signals, Royal Corps of Signals, Bulford Barracks
 15th/19th The King's Royal Hussars, Bulford Barracks (divisional reconnaissance)
 3rd Infantry Divisional Royal Army Service Corps, Bulford Barracks
 3rd Infantry Divisional Royal Army Ordnance Corps, Bulford Barracks
 3rd Infantry Divisional Royal Army Medical Corps, Bulford Barracks
 3rd Infantry Divisional Military Police Company, Corps of Military Police, Bulford Barracks
 7th (Guards) Infantry Brigade
 Headquarters, 7th Infantry Brigade & Signal Section, Royal Corps of Signals, Elizabeth Barracks
 1st Battalion, Grenadier Guards, Elizabeth Barracks
 2nd Battalion, Grenadier Guards, Elizabeth Barracks
 1st Battalion, Coldstream Guards, Chelsea Barracks
 7th Infantry Brigade Anti-Tank Company, Elizabeth Barracks
 8th Infantry Brigade
 Headquarters, 8th Infantry Brigade & Signal Section, Royal Corps of Signals, Crownhill Fort
 1st Battalion, The Suffolk Regiment, Raglan Barracks
 2nd Battalion, The Duke of York's Own East Yorkshire Regiment, Stonehouse Barracks
 2nd Battalion, The Gloucestershire Regiment, Stonehouse Barracks
 8th Infantry Brigade Anti-Tank Company, Stonehouse Barracks
 9th Infantry Brigade
 Headquarters, 9th Infantry Brigade & Signal Section, Royal Corps of Signals, Cambridge Barracks
 2nd Battalion, The Lincolnshire Regiment, East Weare Camp
 1st Battalion, The King's Own Scottish Borderers, Cambridge Barracks
 2nd Battalion, The Royal Ulster Rifles, Albany Barracks
 9th Infantry Brigade Anti-Tank Company, Cambridge Barracks
 Divisional Royal Artillery
 Headquarters, Divisional Royal Artillery, Royal Artillery Barracks, Larkhill
 7th Field Regiment, Royal Artillery, Catterick Camp
 23rd Field Regiment, Royal Artillery, Wyvern Barracks
 33rd Field Regiment, Royal Artillery, Royal Artillery Barracks, Larkhill
 20th Anti-Tank Regiment, Royal Artillery, Catterick Camp
 Divisional Royal Engineers
 Headquarters, Divisional Royal Engineers, Bulford Barracks
 246th (Welsh) Field Company, Royal Engineers (TA), Cardiff
 248th (East Anglia) Field Company, Royal Engineers (TA), Bedford
 253rd (West Lancashire) Field Company, Royal Engineers (TA), St Helens
 15th Field Park Company, Royal Engineers, Bulford Barracks

Salisbury Plain Area 
Salisbury Plain Area comprising: The County of Wiltshire (within the following boundaries): The Great Western Railway from the bridge over the River Avon at Freshford to the aqueduct of the Kennet and Avon Canal (1.5 miles west of Bradford-on-Avon), thence the Kennet and Avon Canal to Devizes, The Depot The Wiltshire Regiment, Devizes (on the north bank of the canal), thence the Kennet and Avon Canal to the County boundary at Froxfield, thence the county boundary from Froxfield to the road Fordingbridge-Salisbury at Downton. Thence the road Fordingbridge-Salisbury from the county boundary at Downton to Salisbury; Salisbury; the road Salisbury-Wilton-Great Wishford-Codford-Hegtesbury, the road Warminster-Frome to the county boundary at Whitbourne; thence the county boundary near Whitbourne to the Great Western Railway Bridge over the River Avon near Freshford. That portion of Hampshire including Tidworth and Western District land adjacent.

 Headquarters, Salisbury Plain Area, Bulford Barracks
 Wiltshire Regiment Depot, Le Marchant Barracks
 2nd Field Depot, Royal Artillery, Fargo Barracks

South Midland Area 
South Midland Area comprising: Counties of Warwickshire, Northamptonshire, Huntingdonshire, Buckinghamshire, Berkshire (except Victoria Barracks and Combermere Barracks and portions in Aldershot Command), Oxfordshire, Gloucestershire (except Beachley), Worcestershire, and Wiltshire north of the Salisbury Plain Area.

 Headquarters, South Midland Area, Cowley Barracks commanded by Colonel Hugh Tennant MacMullen
1st Battalion, Princess Victoria's Royal Irish Fusiliers, Cowley Barracks
4th Battalion, The Northamptonshire Regiment (TA), Northampton
Warwickshire Regiment Depot, Budbrooke Barracks
Gloucestershire Regiment Depot, Horfield Barracks
Worcestershire Regiment Depot, Norton Barracks
Oxfordshire and Buckinghamshire Light Infantry Depot, Bullingdon Barracks
Northamptonshire Regiment Depot, Northampton Barracks
Berkshire Regiment Depot, Brock Barracks
3rd Survey Regiment, Royal Artillery (TA), Bristol
5th Survey Regiment, Royal Artillery (TA), Bristol
22nd Light Anti-Aircraft Regiment, Royal Artillery (TA), RAF Cosford
89th Light Anti-Aircraft Battery, Royal Artillery (TA), RAF Bicester
128th Light Anti-Aircraft Battery, Royal Artillery (TA), RAF Brize Norton
131st Light Anti-Aircraft Battery, Royal Artillery (TA), RAF Aston Down
214 Medium Battery, Royal Artillery (TA), Huddersfield
212th (North Midland) Army Field Company, Royal Engineers (TA), Smethwick
268th Field Company, Royal Engineers (TA), Olton
215th Field Park Company, Royal Engineers (TA), Smethwick
269th Field Park Company, Royal Engineers (TA), Olton
20th Light Armoured Brigade (TA)
Headquarters, 20th Light Armoured Brigade, Gloucester
1st Royal Gloucestershire Hussars, Gloucester
1st Northamptonshire Yeomanry, Northampton
2nd Northamptonshire Yeomanry, Northampton

48th (South Midland) Infantry Division (TA) 

 48th (South Midland) Infantry Division, Oxford
 Headquarters, 48th Infantry Division commanded by Major General Frank Crowther Roberts
 48th (South Midland) Divisional Signals, Royal Corps of Signals, Birmingham
 48th Infantry Divisional Royal Army Service Corps, Oxford
 48th Infantry Divisional Royal Army Ordnance Corps, Oxford
 48th Infantry Divisional Royal Army Medical Corps, Oxford
 48th Infantry Divisional Military Police Company, Corps of Military Police, Oxford
 143rd (West Midlands) Infantry Brigade
 Headquarters, 143rd Infantry Brigade & Signal Section, Royal Corps of Signals, Birmingham
 1/7th Battalion, The Warwickshire Regiment, Coventry
 8th Battalion, The Warwickshire Regiment, Birmingham
 5th (Huntingdonshire) Battalion, The Northamptonshire Regiment, Peterborough
 144th (Gloucester and Worcester) Infantry Brigade
 Headquarters, 144th Infantry Brigade & Signal Section, Royal Corps of Signals, Worcester
 5th Battalion, The Gloucestershire Regiment, Gloucester
 7th Battalion, The Worcestershire Regiment, Kidderminster
 8th Battalion, The Worcestershire Regiment, Worcester
 145th (South Midland) Infantry Brigade
 Headquarters, 145th Infantry Brigade & Signal Section, Royal Corps of Signals, Reading
 4th Battalion, The Oxfordshire and Buckinghamshire Light Infantry, Oxford
 1st Buckinghamshire Battalion, The Oxfordshire and Buckinghamshire Light Infantry, Oxford
 4th Battalion, Princess Charlotte of Wales's Royal Berkshire Regiment, Reading
 Divisional Royal Artillery
 Headquarters, Divisional Royal Artillery, Oxford
 67th (South Midland) Field Regiment, Royal Artillery, Worcester
 68th (South Midland) Field Regiment, Royal Artillery, Birmingham
 99th (Buckinghamshire and Berkshire Yeomanry) Field Regiment, Royal Artillery, Aylesbury
 53rd (Worcestershire Yeomanry) Field Regiment, Royal Artillery, Kidderminster
 Divisional Royal Engineers
 Headquarters, Divisional Royal Engineers, Bristol
 224th (South Midland) Field Company, Royal Engineers, Bristol
 225th (South Midland) Field Company, Royal Engineers, Birmingham
 226th (South Midland) Field Company, Royal Engineers, Reading
 227th (South Midland) Field Park Company, Royal Engineers, Birmingham

61st (2nd South Midland) Infantry Division (2/TA) 

 61st (2nd South Midland) Infantry Division, Oxford
 Headquarters, 61st Infantry Division commanded by Major General Robert John Collins
 61st (South Midland) Divisional Signals, Royal Corps of Signals, Oxford
 61st Infantry Divisional Royal Army Service Corps, Oxford
 61st Infantry Divisional Royal Army Ordnance Corps, Oxford
 61st Infantry Divisional Royal Army Medical Corps, Oxford
 61st Infantry Divisional Military Police Company, Corps of Military Police, Oxford
 182nd (2nd West Midlands) Infantry Brigade
 Headquarters, 182nd Infantry Brigade & Signal Section, Royal Corps of Signals, Birmingham
 2/7th Battalion, The Warwickshire Regiment, Nuneaton
 8th Battalion, The Warwickshire Regiment, Birmingham
 9th Battalion, The Northamptonshire Regiment, Oldbury
 183rd (2nd Gloucester and Worcester) Infantry Brigade
 Headquarters, 144th Infantry Brigade & Signal Section, Royal Corps of Signals, Worcester
7th Battalion, The Gloucestershire Regiment, Stroud
10th Battalion, The Worcestershire Regiment, Evesham
 184th (2nd South Midland) Infantry Brigade
 Headquarters, 145th Infantry Brigade & Signal Section, Royal Corps of Signals, Reading
 5th Battalion, The Oxfordshire and Buckinghamshire Light Infantry, Oxford
2nd Buckinghamshire Battalion, The Oxfordshire and Buckinghamshire Light Infantry, Slough
6th Battalion, Princess Charlotte of Wales's Royal Berkshire Regiment, Reading

South-Western Area 
South-Western Area comprising: Counties of Somerset, Dorsetshire, Devonshire and Cornwall, those portions of Wiltshire not included in South Midland and Salisbury Plain Areas, and that part of Hampshire lying west of the Southern Railway between the county boundary of Downton and the county boundary at Fordingbridge station.

 Headquarters, South-Western Area, Raglan Barracks commanded by Major General William Green
 The Prince of Wales's Own Royal Wiltshire Hussars Yeomanry (TA), Trowbridge
 North Somerset Yeomanry (TA), Bath
 5th (Prince of Wales's) Battalion, The Devonshire Regiment (TA), Plymouth (machine-gun)
 7th (Haytor) Battalion, The Devonshire Regiment (TA), Torquay (machine-gun)
Devonshire Regiment Depot, Wyvern Barracks
Somerset Light Infantry Depot, Jellalabad Barracks
Duke of Cornwall's Light Infantry Depot, Victoria Barracks
Dorsetshire Regiment Depot, The Keep, Dorchester
3rd Infantry Training Group, Newton Abbot
 1st Heavy Regiment, Royal Artillery, Stonehouse Barracks
 51st (Devon) Light Anti-Aircraft Regiment, Royal Artillery (TA), Exeter
 55th (Devon) Light Anti-Aircraft Regiment, Royal Artillery (TA), Exeter
 85th Light Anti-Aircraft Battery, Royal Artillery (TA), RAF Kemble
 90th Light Anti-Aircraft Battery, Royal Artillery (TA), RAF Wroughton
 91st Light Anti-Aircraft Battery, Royal Artillery (TA), RAF Mount Batten
8th Anti-Aircraft Depot, Royal Artillery, HMS Heron
20th Searchlight Depot, Royal Artillery, HMS Heron
22nd Depot, Royal Artillery, Jellalabad Barracks
Portland Coast Defences
Headquarters, Portland Coast Defences, Weymouth
Portland Fire Command, Weymouth
Dorsetshire Heavy Regiment, Royal Artillery (TA), Weymouth
Dorsetshire Fortress Engineers, Royal Engineers (TA), Weymouth
Plymouth and Falmouth Defences
Headquarters, Portland and Falmouth Defences, Plymouth
Devonshire and Cornwall Fortress Engineers, Royal Engineers (TA), Plymouth
South-Western Ports Fixed Defences
Headquarters, Fixed Defences, Plymouth
Rame Fire Command, Plymouth
Drake's Fire Command, HMS Drake
Wembury Fire Command, Wembury Point Holiday Camp
Devonshire Heavy Regiment, Royal Artillery (TA), Plymouth

43rd (Wessex) Infantry Division (TA) 

 43rd (Wessex) Infantry Division, Salisbury
 Headquarters, 43rd Infantry Division commanded by Major General Arthur Nugent Floyer-Acland
 43rd (Wessex) Infantry Divisional Signal, Royal Corps of Signals, Exeter
 43rd Infantry Divisional Royal Army Service Corps, Salisbury
 43rd Infantry Divisional Royal Army Ordnance Corps, Salisbury
 43rd Infantry Divisional Royal Army Medical Corps, Salisbury
 43rd Infantry Divisional Military Police Company, Corps of Military Police, Salisbury
128th (Hampshire) Infantry Brigade
Headquarters, 128th Infantry Brigade & Signal Section, Royal Corps of Signals, Southampton
1/4th Battalion, The Hampshire Regiment, Winchester
2/4th Battalion, The Hampshire Regiment, Southampton
5th Battalion, The Hampshire Regiment, Southampton
129th (South Western) Infantry Brigade
Headquarters, 129th Infantry Brigade & Signal Section, Royal Corps of Signals, Bath
4th Battalion, Prince Albert's Somerset Light Infantry, Bath
4th Battalion, The Duke of Edinburgh's Wiltshire Regiment, Trowbridge
5th Battalion, The Duke of Edinburgh's Wiltshire Regiment, Trowbridge
130th (Hampshire and Dorset) Infantry Brigade
Headquarters, 130th Infantry Brigade & Signal Section, Royal Corps of Signals, Exeter
7th Battalion, The Hampshire Regiment, Bournemouth
4th Battalion, The Dorsetshire Regiment, Dorchester
5th Battalion, The Dorsetshire Regiment, Poole
Divisional Royal Artillery
Headquarters, Divisional Royal Artillery, Salisbury
94th (Queen's Own Dorset Yeomanry) Field Regiment, Royal Artillery, Dorchester
112th Field Regiment, Royal Artillery, Swindon
141st Field Regiment, Royal Artillery, Sherborne
59th (Duke of Connaught's Hampshire) Anti-Tank Regiment, Royal Artillery, Portsmouth
Divisional Royal Engineers
Headquarters, Divisional Royal Engineers, Bath
43rd Infantry Divisional Field Post, Royal Engineers, Bath
204th (Wessex) Field Company, Royal Engineers, Bath
260th Field Company, Royal Engineers, Chippenham
207th (Wessex) Field Park Company, Royal Engineers, Bath

45th (West Country) Infantry Division (2/TA) 

 45th (West Country) Infantry Division, Exeter
 Headquarters, 45th Infantry Division commanded by Major General Frederick Vavasour Broome Witts
 45th (West Country) Divisional Signals, Royal Corps of Signals, Exeter
 45th Infantry Divisional Royal Army Service Corps, Exeter
 45th Infantry Divisional Royal Army Ordnance Corps, Exeter
 45th Infantry Divisional Royal Army Medical Corps, Exeter
 45th Infantry Divisional Military Police Company, Corps of Military Police, Exeter
134th (Devonshire) Infantry Brigade
Headquarters, 134th Infantry Brigade & Signal Section, Royal Corps of Signals, Exeter
4th (1st Rifle Volunteers) Battalion, The Devonshire Regiment, Exeter
6th Battalion, The Devonshire Regiment, Barnstaple
8th Battalion, The Devonshire Regiment, Exmouth
135th (Somerset) Infantry Brigade
Headquarters, 135th Infantry Brigade & Signal Section, Royal Corps of Signals, Taunton
5th Battalion, Prince Albert's Somerset Light Infantry, Taunton
6th Battalion, Prince Albert's Somerset Light Infantry, Wells
7th Battalion, Prince Albert's Somerset Light Infantry, Bridgewater
136th (2nd Devon and Cornwall) Infantry Brigade
Headquarters, 135th Infantry Brigade & Signal Section, Royal Corps of Signals, Barnstaple
9th Battalion, The Devonshire Regiment, Barnstaple
4th Battalion, The Duke of Cornwall's Light Infantry, Truro
5th Battalion, The Duke of Cornwall's Light Infantry, St Austell
Divisional Royal Artillery
Headquarters, Divisional Royal Artillery, Exeter
55th (Wessex) Field Regiment, Royal Artillery, Taunton
96th (Royal Devonshire Yeomanry) Field Regiment, Royal Artillery, Exeter
142nd Field Regiment, Royal Artillery, Dartmouth
69th Anti-Tank Regiment, Royal Artillery, Gosport
Divisional Royal Engineers
Headquarters, Divisional Royal Engineers, Exeter
205th (Wessex) Field Company, Royal Engineers, Roborough
259th Field Company, Royal Engineers, Uffculme
261st Field Park Company, Royal Engineers, Uffculme

Southern Area 
Southern Area comprising: Hampshire (excluding those portions of the county Included in Aldershot Command and Salisbury Plain and South-Western Areas.).

 Headquarters, Southern Area commanded by Brigadier John Noel Lumley
 Hampshire Regiment Depot, Peninsula Barracks
 Rifle Brigade Depot, Peninsula Barracks
 1st Medium Regiment, Royal Artillery, Cambridge Barracks
 4th Medium Regiment, Royal Artillery, Fort Brockhurst
 71st Light Anti-Aircraft Battery, Royal Artillery (TA), RAF Fareham
 84th Light Anti-Aircraft Battery, Royal Artillery (TA), RAF Boscombe Down
 7th Anti-Aircraft Depot, Royal Artillery, Le Marchant Barracks
 9th Anti-Aircraft Depot, Royal Artillery, Blandford Camp
 19th Searchlight Depot, Royal Artillery, Le Marchant Barracks
 21st Searchlight Depot, Royal Artillery, Blandford Camp
 The Survey Battalion, Royal Engineers, McMullen Barracks
 19th Field Survey Company, Royal Engineers, Fort Fareham
 4th Fortress Company, Royal Engineers, McMullen Barracks
 Experimental Bridging Establishment, Royal Engineers, Cavalry Barracks, Christchurch

Aldershot Command 
Aldershot Command comprising: Encompassing the River Loddon where crossed by the Southern Railway at Loddon Bridge (south-east of Reading) along the railway through Wokingham, Bracknell and Ascot to Sunningdale – thence the eastern boundaries of the parishes of Chobham and Horsell to the railway at Woking – thence southward along the railway (omitting the portions of the parishes of Guildford and Artington to the west of the railway and the three small portions of Sussex lying to the north of the railway) to Liss – thence northward along the road leading to Reading, through Selborne, Alton and Odiham (but inclusive of the portions of the parishes of Alton and Chawton lying west of that road) – to Swallowfield – thence along the River Loddon to Loddon Bridge.

 Headquarters, Aldershot Command, Aldershot Garrison
 Aldershot Command Pay Detachment, Royal Army Pay Corps, Aldershot
 Aldershot Command Pay Detachment, Royal Army Pay Corps, Woking
 Aldershot Command Signals, Royal Corps of Signals, Aldershot
 A Corps Signals, Royal Corps of Signals, Aldershot
1st Cavalry A.C.R Signal Troop, Royal Corps of Signals, Aldershot
 2nd General Headquarters Signals, Royal Corps of Signals, Aldershot
 4th Tank Signal Section, Royal Corps of Signals, Aldershot
 1st Artillery Signal Section, Royal Corps of Signals, Aldershot
 3rd Artillery Signal Section, Royal Corps of Signals, Aldershot
 6th Artillery Signal Section, Royal Corps of Signals, Aldershot
 11th Artillery Signal Section, Royal Corps of Signals, Aldershot
 12th (Prince of Wales's Own) Royal Lancers, Aldershot
 Mechanised Experimental Establishment, Royal Armoured Corps, Gibraltar Barracks
 2nd Medium Regiment, Royal Artillery, Longmoor
 137th Light Anti-Aircraft Battery, Royal Artillery (TA), RAF Farnborough
 5th Anti-Aircraft Depot, Royal Artillery, Arborfield Garrison
 6th Anti-Aircraft Depot, Royal Artillery, Arborfield Garrison
 Railway Training Centre, Royal Engineers, Longmoor Military Railway
Royal Engineers Regimental Headquarters & Maintenance Depot, Aldershot
8th Railway Construction Company, Royal Engineers, Longmoor
 10th Railway Construction Company, Royal Engineers, Longmoor
1st Company, Royal Army Service Corps, Aldershot
3rd Company, Royal Army Service Corps, Aldershot
6th Company, Royal Army Service Corps, Aldershot
9th Company, Royal Army Service Corps, Bordon
35th Company, Royal Army Service Corps, Aldershot
41st Company, Royal Army Service Corps, Aldershot
64th Company, Royal Army Service Corps, Aldershot
Royal Army Service Corps Training Centre, Aldershot
Training Battalion, Aldershot
Motor Transport Depot, Royal Army Service Corps, Aldershot
A Company, Royal Army Service Corps, Aldershot
C Company, Royal Army Service Corps, Aldershot
1st Section, Royal Army Ordnance Corps, Aldershot
5th Section, Royal Army Ordnance Corps, Aldershot
 1st Section, Royal Army Ordnance Corps, Aldershot
 5th Section, Royal Army Ordnance Corps, Bramley Ordnance Depot
 1st Company, Royal Army Medical Corps, Aldershot
 2nd Company, Royal Army Medical Corps, Bramley
 Royal Army Medical Corps Depot
 Headquarters, RAMC Depot, Aldershot
 A Depot Company, Royal Army Medical Corps
 B Depot Company, Royal Army Medical Corps
 C Depot Company, Royal Army Medical Corps
 2nd Veterinary Platoon, Royal Army Veterinary Corps, Aldershot
Corps of Military Police Depot, Aldershot
Military Policing Section, Corps of Military Police, Bordon
Military Policing Section, Corps of Military Police, Princess Royal Barracks
Military Policing Section, Corps of Military Police, Arborfield Garrison
Military Policing Section, Corps of Military Police, Crookham
 1st Army Tank Brigade
 Headquarters, 1st Army Tank Brigade, Aldershot
 4th Royal Tank Regiment, Gibraltar Barracks
 7th Royal Tank Regiment, Catterick Camp
 8th Royal Tank Regiment, Perham Down
 1st Anti-Aircraft Brigade
 Headquarters, 1st Anti-Aircraft Brigade & 1st AA Bde Signals, Royal Corps of Signals, Blackdown
 6th Anti-Aircraft Regiment, Royal Artillery, Blackdown
 1st Light Anti-Aircraft Battery, Royal Artillery, Blackdown
 1st Anti-Aircraft Battalion, Royal Engineers, Blackdown

1st Infantry Division 

 1st Infantry Division, Aldershot
 Headquarters, 1st Infantry Division commanded by Major General Harold Rupert Leofric George Alexander
 1st Infantry Divisional Signals, Royal Corps of Signals, Aldershot
 13th/18th (Queen Mary's Own) Royal Hussars, Shorncliffe Army Camp (divisional armoured car reconnaissance)
 2nd Battalion, The Cheshire Regiment, Bordon (machine-gun)
 1st Infantry Divisional Royal Army Ordnance Corps, Aldershot
 1st Infantry Divisional Royal Army Medical Corps, Aldershot
 1st Company, Corps of Military Police, Aldershot
1st (Guards) Infantry Brigade
 Headquarters, 1st Infantry Brigade & Signal Section, Royal Corps of Signals, Aldershot
 3rd Battalion, Grenadier Guards, Aldershot
 2nd Battalion, Coldstream Guards, Aldershot
 2nd Battalion, The Hampshire Regiment, Aldershot
 1st Infantry Brigade Anti-Tank Company, Aldershot
2nd Infantry Brigade
 Headquarters, 2nd Infantry Brigade & Signal Section, Royal Corps of Signals, Aldershot
 1st Battalion, The Loyal North Lancashire Regiment, Aldershot
 2nd Battalion, The Prince of Wales's North Staffordshire Regiment, Aldershot
 1st Battalion, Gordon Highlanders, Aldershot
 2nd Infantry Brigade Anti-Tank Company, Aldershot
3rd Infantry Brigade
 Headquarters, 3rd Infantry Brigade & Signal Section, Royal Corps of Signals, Bordon
 1st Battalion, The Duke of Wellington's West Riding Regiment, Bordon
 2nd Battalion, The Nottinghamshire and Derbyshire Regiment (The Sherwood Foresters), bordon
 1st Battalion, The King's Shropshire Light Infantry, Bordon
 3rd Infantry Brigade Anti-Tank Company, Bordon
Divisional Royal Artillery
 Headquarters, Divisional Royal Artillery, Aldershot
 2nd Field Regiment, Royal Artillery, Bordon
 19th Field Regiment, Royal Artillery, Bordon
 24th Field Regiment, Royal Artillery, Aldershot
 21st Anti-Tank Regiment, Royal Artillery, Aldershot
Divisional Royal Engineers
 Headquarters, Divisional Royal Engineers, Aldershot
 17th Field Company, Royal Engineers, Aldershot
 23rd Field Company, Royal Engineers, Aldershot
 26th Field Company, Royal Engineers, Aldershot
 6th Field Park Company, Royal Engineers, Aldershot
Divisional Royal Army Service Corps
Headquarters, Divisional Royal Army Service Corps, Aldershot
7th Company, Royal Army Service Corps
40th Company, Royal Army Service Corps
42nd Company, Royal Army Service Corps

2nd Infantry Division 

 2nd Infantry Division, Aldershot
 Headquarters, 2nd Infantry Division commanded by Major General Henry Charles Lloyd
 2nd Infantry Divisional Signals, Royal Corps of Signals, Aldershot
 4th/7th Royal Dragoon Guards, Aldershot (divisional armoured car reconnaissance)
 2nd Battalion, The Manchester Regiment, Aldershot (machine-gun)
 2nd Infantry Divisional Royal Army Ordnance Corps, Aldershot
 2nd Infantry Divisional Royal Army Medical Corps, Aldershot
2nd Company, Corps of Military Police, Aldershot
4th Infantry Brigade
 Headquarters, 4th Infantry Brigade & Signal Section, Royal Corps of Signals, Aldershot
 1st Battalion, The Royal Scots, Aldershot
 2nd Battalion, The Royal Norfolk Regiment, Oxney
 1st Battalion, The Border Regiment, Aldershot
 4th Infantry Brigade Anti-Tank Company, Aldershot
5th Infantry Brigade
 Headquarters, 5th Infantry Brigade & Signal Section, Royal Corps of Signals, Aldershot
 2nd Battalion, The Royal Warwickshire Regiment, Aldershot
 2nd Battalion, The Dorsetshire Regiment, Aldershot
 1st Battalion, The Queen's Own Cameron Highlanders, Aldershot
 5th Infantry Brigade Anti-Tank Company, Aldershot
6th Infantry Brigade
 Headquarters, 6th Infantry Brigade & Signal Section, Royal Corps of Signals, Blackdown
 1st Battalion, The Royal Welch Fusiliers, Blackdown
 1st Battalion, Princess Charlotte of Wales's Royal Berkshire Regiment, Blackdown
 2nd Battalion, The Durham Light Infantry, Woking
 6th Infantry Brigade Anti-Tank Company, Blackdown
Divisional Royal Artillery
 Headquarters, Divisional Royal Artillery, Aldershot
 10th Field Regiment, Royal Artillery, Princess Royal Barracks
 16th Field Regiment, Royal Artillery, Ewshot
 18th Field Regiment, Royal Artillery, Princess Royal Barracks
 13th Anti-Tank Regiment, Royal Artillery, Aldershot
Divisional Royal Engineers
 Headquarters, Divisional Royal Engineers, Aldershot
 5th Field Company, Royal Engineers, Aldershot
 11th Field Company, Royal Engineers, Aldershot
 38th Field Company, Royal Engineers, Aldershot
 21st Field Park Company, Royal Engineers, Aldershot
Divisional Royal Army Service Corps
Headquarters, Divisional Royal Army Service Corps, Aldershot
8th Company, Royal Army Service Corps
24th Company, Royal Army Service Corps
29th Company, Royal Army Service Corps

Anti-Aircraft Command (TA) 
Anti-Aircraft Command controlled all of the AA units (minus the regular 1st and 2nd AA brigades).

 Headquarters, Anti-Aircraft Command, RAF Stanmore Park commanded by Lieutenant General Frederick Alfred Pile

1st Anti-Aircraft Division 
1st AA Division covering London, Dover, and Slough.

 Headquarters, 1st AA Division, RAF Uxbridge commanded by Major General Frederick Alfred Pile
 1st Anti-Aircraft Divisional Signals, Royal Corps of Signals, RAF Northolt
 1st Anti-Aircraft Divisional Workshop, Royal Army Ordnance Corps, RAF Chingford
 26th (London) Anti-Aircraft Brigade
 Headquarters, 26th AA Brigade, Brompton Road
 53rd (City of London) Heavy Anti-Aircraft Regiment, Royal Artillery, War Office
 86th (Honourable Artillery Company) Heavy Anti-Aircraft Regiment, Royal Artillery, Finsbury
 88th Heavy Anti-Aircraft Regiment, Royal Artillery, White City
 26th AA Brigade Company, Royal Army Service Corps, Brompton Road
38th (London) Light Anti-Aircraft Brigade
Headquarters, 38th LAA Bde, Duke of York's Headquarters
26th (London Electrical Engineers) Anti-Aircraft Battalion, Royal Engineers, Duke of York's Headquarters
27th (London Electrical Engineers) Anti-Aircraft Battalion, Royal Engineers, Mitcham Lane
75th (Middlesex) Searchlight Regiment, Royal Artillery, Cowley
38th AA Bde Company, Royal Army Service Corps, Wandsworth
48th (City of London) Anti-Aircraft Brigade
Headquarters, 48th AA Bde, Lewisham
54th (City of London) Heavy Anti-Aircraft Regiment, Royal Artillery, Putney
60th (City of London) Heavy Anti-Aircraft Regiment, Royal Artillery, Catford
97th (The London Scottish) Heavy Anti-Aircraft Regiment, Royal Artillery, Westminster
99th (London Welsh) Heavy Anti-Aircraft Regiment, Royal Artillery, London W8
48th AA Bde Company, Royal Army Service Corps, Lewisham
49th (London) Anti-Aircraft Brigade
Headquarters, 49th AA Bde, Lower Belgrave Street
51st (London) Heavy Anti-Aircraft Regiment, Royal Artillery, Duke of York's Headquarters
52nd (London) Heavy Anti-Aircraft Regiment, Royal Artillery, Acton
84th (Middlesex, London Transport) Heavy Anti-Aircraft Regiment, Royal Artillery, Willesden
48th AA Bde Company, Royal Army Service Corps, Lower Belgrave Street

2nd Anti-Aircraft Division 
2nd AA Division covering Kingston upon Hull, The Humber, Leeds, Sheffield, and Nottingham. Aligned with No. 12 Group RAF.

 Headquarters 2nd AA Division, RAF Hucknall
 2nd AA Division Signals, Royal Corps of Signals, RAF Hucknall
 2nd AA Division Workshop, Royal Army Ordnance Corps, RAF Hucknall
 32nd (Midland) Anti-Aircraft Brigade
 Headquarters, 32nd AA Bde, Derby
68th (North Midland) Heavy Anti-Aircraft Regiment, Royal Artillery, Derby
42nd (The Robin Hoods, Sherwood Foresters) Anti-Aircraft Battalion, Royal Engineers, Nottingham
44th (The Leicestershire Regiment) Anti-Aircraft Battalion, Royal Engineers, Leicester
50th (The Northamptonshire Regiment) Anti-Aircraft Battalion, Royal Engineers, Northampton
 32nd AA Bde Company, Royal Army Service Corps, Derby
40th (South Midlands) Anti-Aircraft Brigade
Headquarters, 40th AA Bde, Duxford
60th (9th Battalion, The Duke of Cambridge's Own Middlesex Regiment) Searchlight Regiment, Royal Artillery, Willesden
69th (10th (3rd City of London) Battalion, The City of London Regiment (Royal Fusiliers)) Searchlight Regiment, Royal Artillery, Harrow Road
33rd (St Pancras) Anti-Aircraft Battalion, Royal Engineers, Albany Street
36th (Middlesex) Anti-Aircraft Battalion, Royal Engineers, Edgware
58th (Middlesex) Anti-Aircraft Battalion, Royal Engineers, Harrow
40th AA Bde Company, Royal Army Service Corps, Barking
41st (London) Anti-Aircraft Brigade
Headquarters, 41st AA Bde, Ebury Street
78th (1st East Anglian) Heavy Anti-Aircraft Regiment, Royal Artillery, Norwich
32nd (7th (City of London) Battalion, The City of London Regiment (Royal Fusiliers)) Anti-Aircraft Battalion, Royal Engineers, Finsbury Square
64th (1/6th Battalion, The Essex Regiment) Searchlight Regiment, Royal Artillery, The Cedars
65th (2/6th Battalion, The Essex Regiment) Searchlight Regiment, Royal Artillery, Southend-on-Sea
50th Light Anti-Aircraft Brigade
Headquarters, 50th LAA Bde, Nottingham
26th Light Anti-Aircraft Regiment, Royal Artillery, Derby (Mobile reserve)

3rd Anti-Aircraft Division 
3rd AA Division covering the Firth of Forth, The Clyde, Scapa Flow, Tyne River, Tees River, and Belfast. Aligned with No. 13 Group RAF.

 Headquarters, 3rd AA Division, RAF Edinburgh
 3rd AA Division Signals, Royal Corps of Signals, RAF Edinburgh
 3rd AA Division Workshop, Royal Army Ordnance Corps, RAF Edinburgh
 3rd (Northern Ireland) Anti-Aircraft Brigade (Supplementary Reserve)
 Headquarters, 3rd AA Brigade, Belfast
 3rd (Ulster) Searchlight Regiment, Royal Artillery, Belfast
 8th (Belfast) Heavy Anti-Aircraft Regiment, Royal Artillery, Belfast
 9th (Londonderry) Heavy Anti-Aircraft Regiment, Royal Artillery, Derry
 102nd Heavy Anti-Aircraft Regiment, Royal Artillery, Antrim
 3rd AA Bde Company, Royal Army Service Corps, Belfast
 36th Anti-Aircraft Brigade
 Headquarters, 36th AA Bde, Edinburgh
 71st (Forth) Heavy Anti-Aircraft Regiment, Royal Artillery, Dunfermline
 94th Heavy Anti-Aircraft Regiment, Royal Artillery, Turnhouse
 101st Heavy Anti-Aircraft Regiment, Royal Artillery, Inverness
 36th AA Bde Company, Royal Army Service Corps, Edinburgh
 42nd Anti-Aircraft Brigade
 Headquarters, 42nd AA Bde, Glasgow
 74th (City of Glasgow) Heavy Anti-Aircraft Regiment, Royal Artillery, Glasgow
 83rd (Blythswood) Heavy Anti-Aircraft Regiment, Royal Artillery, Bridgeton
 100th Heavy Anti-Aircraft Regiment, Royal Artillery, Inverness
 42nd AA Bde Company, Royal Army Service Corps, Glasgow
 51st Light Anti-Aircraft Brigade
 Headquarters, 51st LAA Bde, Edinburgh
 14th (West Lothian, Royal Scots) Light Anti-Aircraft Regiment, Royal Artillery, Edinburgh
 18th Light Anti-Aircraft Regiment, Royal Artillery, Glasgow
 19th Light Anti-Aircraft Regiment, Royal Artillery, Edinburgh
 31st Light Anti-Aircraft Regiment, Royal Artillery, Perth
 32nd Light Anti-Aircraft Regiment, Royal Artillery, Falkirk
 52nd Light Anti-Aircraft Brigade
 Headquarters, 52nd AA Bde, Stirling
 51st (Highland) Anti-Aircraft Battalion, Royal Engineers, Dundee
 52nd (4th/5th (Queen's Edinburgh) Battalion, The Royal Scots) Searchlight Regiment, Royal Artillery, Edinburgh
 56th (5th Battalion, The Scottish Rifles (Cameronians)) Searchlight Regiment, Royal Artillery, Glasgow
 57th (8th Battalion, The Scottish Rifles (Cameronians)) Searchlight Regiment, Royal Artillery, South Glasgow

4th Anti-Aircraft Division 
4th AA Division covering Liverpool, Birmingham, Coventry, Manchester, Cardiff, and Newport. Aligned with No. 9 Group RAF.

 Headquarters, 4th AA Division, RAF Hawarden
 4th AA Division Signals, Royal Corps of Signals, RAF Hawarden
 4th AA Division Workshop, Royal Army Ordnance Corps, RAF Hawarden
 33rd (Western) Anti-Aircraft Brigade
 Headquarters, 33rd AA Bde, Woolton
 70th (3rd West Lancashire) Heavy Anti-Aircraft Regiment, Royal Artillery, Liverpool
 81st Heavy Anti-Aircraft Regiment, Royal Artillery, Stockport
 93rd Heavy Anti-Aircraft Regiment, Royal Artillery, Oxton
 62nd (Loyals) Searchlight Regiment, Royal Artillery, Preston
 38th (The King's Regiment) Anti-Aircraft Battalion, Royal Engineers, Liverpool
33rd AA Bde Company, Royal Army Service Corps, Woolton
34th (South Midland) Anti-Aircraft Brigade
Headquarters, 34th AA Bde, Coventry
69th (Royal Warwickshire Regiment) Heavy Anti-Aircraft Regiment, Royal Artillery, Edgbaston
73rd Heavy Anti-Aircraft Regiment, Royal Artillery, Wolverhampton
95th Heavy Anti-Aircraft Regiment, Royal Artillery, Birmingham
34th AA Bde Company, Royal Army Service Corps, Coventry
44th (East Lancashire) Anti-Aircraft Brigade
Headquarters, 44th AA Bde, Manchester
65th (The Manchester Regiment) Heavy Anti-Aircraft Regiment, Royal Artillery, Hulme
71st (East Lancashire) Searchlight Regiment, Royal Artillery, Manchester
39th (The Lancashire Fusiliers) Anti-Aircraft Battalion, Royal Engineers, Salford
44th AA Bde Company, Royal Army Service Corps, Manchester
53rd (West Lancashire) Light Anti-Aircraft Brigade
Headquarters, 53rd AA Bde, Chester
15th (Isle of Man) Light Anti-Aircraft Regiment, Royal Artillery, Douglas, Isle of Man (technically not a 'British' unit, see: Isle of Man for more)
21st Light Anti-Aircraft Regiment, Royal Artillery, Liverpool
33rd Light Anti-Aircraft Regiment, Royal Artillery, Liverpool
53rd AA Bde Company, Royal Army Service Corps, Chester
54th (North Midland) Anti-Aircraft Brigade
Headquarters, 54th AA Bde, South Birmingham
59th (Warwickshire) Searchlight Regiment, Royal Artillery, Birmingham
61st (South Lancashire Regiment) Searchlight Regiment, Royal Artillery, St Helen
41st (5th Battalion, The Prince of Wales's North Staffordshire Regiment) Anti-Aircraft Battalion, Royal Engineers, Stoke-on-Trent
45th (Royal Warwickshire Regiment) Anti-Aircraft Battalion, Royal Engineers, Birmingham
54th AA Bde Company, Royal Army Service Corps, South Birmingham

5th Anti-Aircraft Division 
5th AA Division covering Bristol, Plymouth, Portsmouth, Isle of Portland, Southampton, and Cardiff. Aligned with No. 10 Group RAF.

 Headquarters, 5th AA Division, RAF Henley-on-Thames
 5th AA Divisional Signals, Royal Corps of Signals, RAF Henley-on-Thames
 5th AA Divisional Workshop, Royal Army Ordnance Corps, RAF Henley-on-Thames
 35th (Southern) Anti-Aircraft Brigade
 Headquarters, 35th AA Bde, Fareham
 56th (Cornwall) Heavy Anti-Aircraft Regiment, Royal Artillery, Falmouth
 57th (Wessex) Heavy Anti-Aircraft Regiment, Royal Artillery, Portsmouth
 72nd (Hampshire) Heavy Anti-Aircraft Regiment, Royal Artillery, Southampton
 48th (Hampshire) Anti-Aircraft Battalion, Royal Engineers, Portsmouth
 35th AA Bde Company, Royal Army Service Corps, Fareham
 45th (Welsh) Anti-Aircraft Brigade
 Headquarters, 45th AA Bde, Cardiff
 77th (Welsh) Heavy Anti-Aircraft Regiment, Royal Artillery, Cardiff
 67th (6th (Glamorgan) Battalion, The Welch Regiment) Searchlight Regiment, Royal Artillery, Cardiff
 68th (1st (Rifle) Battalion, The Monmouthshire Regiment) Searchlight Regiment, Royal Artillery, Newport
 45th AA Bde Company, Royal Army Service Corps, Cardiff
 46th (Gloucestershire) Anti-Aircraft Brigade
 Headquarters, 46th AA Bde, Bristol
 76th (Gloucestershire) Heavy Anti-Aircraft Regiment, Royal Artillery, Clifton
 98th Heavy Anti-Aircraft Regiment, Royal Artillery, Cheltenham
 66th (4th (City of Bristol) Battalion, The Gloucestershire Regiment) Searchlight Regiment, Royal Artillery, Bristol
 46th AA Bde Company, Royal Army Service Corps, Bristol
 47th (South) Anti-Aircraft Brigade
 Headquarters, 47th AA Bde, Grosvenor Gardens
 80th (Berkshire) Heavy Anti-Aircraft Regiment, Royal Artillery, Reading
 63rd (4th Battalion, The Queen's Royal West Surrey Regiment) Searchlight Regiment, Royal Artillery, Croydon
 72nd (Middlesex) Searchlight Regiment, Royal Artillery, Twickenham
 30th (Surrey) Anti-Aircraft Battalion, Royal Engineers, Kingston upon Thames
 35th (First Surrey Rifles) Anti-Aircraft Battalion, Royal Engineers, Camberwell
 47th AA Bde Company, Royal Army Service Corps, Grosvenor Gardens

6th Anti-Aircraft Division 
6th AA Division covering Thames and Medway and Harwich. Aligned with No. 11 Group RAF.

 Headquarters, 6th AA Division, RAF Uxbridge
 6th AA Divisional Signals, Royal Corps of Signals, RAF Uxbridge
 6th AA Divisional Workshop, Royal Army Ordnance Corps, RAF Uxbridge
 27th (Home Counties) Anti-Aircraft Brigade
 Headquarters, 27th AA Bde, Lingfield
 70th (Sussex) Searchlight Regiment, Royal Artillery, Brighton
 31st (City of London Rifles) Anti-Aircraft Battalion, Royal Engineers, Sutton
 34th (Queen's Own Royal West Kent) Anti-Aircraft Battalion, Royal Engineers, Blackheath
 27th AA Bde Company, Royal Army Service Corps, Lingfield
 28th (Thames and Medway) Anti-Aircraft Brigade
 Headquarters, 28th AA Bde, Kitchener Barracks, Kitchener Barracks
 55th (Kent) Heavy Anti-Aircraft Regiment, Royal Artillery, Rochester
 58th (Kent) Heavy Anti-Aircraft Regiment, Royal Artillery, Erith
 75th (Home Counties) (Cinque Ports) Heavy Anti-Aircraft Regiment, Royal Artillery, Dover
 89th (Cinque Ports) Heavy Anti-Aircraft Regiment, Royal Artillery, Sittingbourne
 28th AA Bde Company, Royal Army Service Corps, Kitchener Barracks
 29th (East Anglian) Anti-Aircraft Brigade
 Headquarters, 29th AA Bde, South Kensington
 28th (Essex) Anti-Aircraft Battalion, Royal Engineers, Brentwood
 29th (Kent) Anti-Aircraft Battalion, Royal Engineers, Chatham
 73rd (Kent Fortress) Anti-Aircraft Battalion, Royal Engineers, Bexleyheath
 74th (Essex Fortress) Anti-Aircraft Battalion, Royal Engineers, Tottenham
 29th AA Bde Company, Royal Army Service Corps, South Kensington
 37th (Home Counties) Anti-Aircraft Brigade
 Headquarters, 37th AA Bde, Hendon
 59th (Essex Regiment) Heavy Anti-Aircraft Regiment, Royal Artillery, Walthamstow
 61st (Middlesex) Heavy Anti-Aircraft Regiment, Royal Artillery, Pentonville
 79th (Hertfordshire Yeomanry) Heavy Anti-Aircraft Regiment, Royal Artillery, Watford
 82nd (Essex) Heavy Anti-Aircraft Regiment, Royal Artillery, Barking
 90th Heavy Anti-Aircraft Regiment, Royal Artillery, Barking
 37th AA Bde Company, Royal Army Service Corps, Hendon
 56th (Home Counties) Light Anti-Aircraft Brigade
 Headquarters, 56th LAA Bde, RAF Uxbridge
 11th (City of London Yeomanry) Light Anti-Aircraft Regiment, Royal Artillery, London EC1
 12th (Finsbury Rifles) Light Anti-Aircraft Regiment, Royal Artillery, Pentonville
 16th Light Anti-Aircraft Regiment, Royal Artillery, Sittingbourne
 17th Light Anti-Aircraft Regiment, Royal Artillery, Chelsea

7th Anti-Aircraft Division 
7th AA Division covering River Tyne, River Tees, and Middlesbrough.

 Headquarters, 7th AA Division, RAF Newcastle
 7th AA Divisional Signals, Royal Corps of Signals, RAF Newcastle
 7th AA Divisional Workshop, Royal Army Ordnance Corps, RAF Newcastle
 30th (Northumbrian) Anti-Aircraft Brigade
 Headquarters, 30th AA Bde, Sunderland
 63rd (Northumbrian) Heavy Anti-Aircraft Regiment, Royal Artillery, Sunderland
 64th (Northumbrian) Heavy Anti-Aircraft Regiment, Royal Artillery, North Shields
 87th Heavy Anti-Aircraft Regiment, Royal Artillery, Hebburn
 53rd (5th Battalion, The Royal Northumberland Fusiliers) Searchlight Regiment, Royal Artillery, Walker on Tyne
 37th (Tyne Electrical Engineers) Anti-Aircraft Battalion, Royal Engineers, Tynemouth
 30th AA Bde Company, Royal Army Service Corps, Sunderland
 31st (North Midland) Anti-Aircraft Brigade
 Headquarters, 31st AA Bde, York
 66th (Leeds Rifles) (West Yorkshire Regiment) Heavy Anti-Aircraft Regiment, Royal Artillery, Leeds
 96th Heavy Anti-Aircraft Regiment, Royal Artillery, Castleford
 43rd (5th Duke of Wellington's Regiment) Anti-Aircraft Battalion, Royal Engineers, Huddersfield
 49th (The West Yorkshire Regiment) Anti-Aircraft Battalion, Royal Engineers, Bradford
 39th (Eastern) Anti-Aircraft Brigade
 Headquarters, 39th AA Bde, RAF Digby
 62nd (Northumbrian) Heavy Anti-Aircraft Regiment, Royal Artillery, Kingston upon Hull
 67th (York and Lancaster Regiment) Heavy Anti-Aircraft Regiment, Royal Artillery, Rotherham
 91st Heavy Anti-Aircraft Regiment, Royal Artillery, Goole
 40th (The Sherwood Foresters) Anti-Aircraft Battalion, Royal Engineers, Chesterfield
 46th (The Lincolnshire Regiment) Anti-Aircraft Battalion, Royal Engineers, Grimsby
 39th AA Bde Company, Royal Army Service Corps, RAF Digby
 43rd (Durham) Anti-Aircraft Brigade
 Headquarters, 43rd AA Bde, West Hartlepool
 85th (Tees) Heavy Anti-Aircraft Regiment, Royal Artillery, Middlesbrough
 54th (1/5th Battalion, The Durham Light Infantry) Searchlight Regiment, Royal Artillery, Stockton-on-Tees
 55th (2/5th Battalion, The Durham Light Infantry) Searchlight Regiment, Royal Artillery, West Hartlepool
 47th (Durham Light Infantry) Anti-Aircraft Battalion, Royal Engineers, Sunderland
 43rd AA Bde Company, Royal Army Service Corps, West Hartlepool
 57th (Eastern) Light Anti-Aircraft Brigade
 Headquarters, 57th LAA Bde, RAF Newcastle
 13th Light Anti-Aircraft Regiment, Royal Artillery, Hillsborough
 28th Light Anti-Aircraft Regiment, Royal Artillery, Nottingham
 29th Light Anti-Aircraft Regiment, Royal Artillery, Grimsby
 30th Light Anti-Aircraft Regiment, Royal Artillery, Ipswich

Middle East Command 
Middle East Command controlled all the forces based in: Sudan, Aden, Somaliland, Palestine, Transjordan, and Egypt.

 Headquarters, Middle East Command, Cairo commanded by Lieutenant General Sir Archibald Percival Wavell
 Somaliland Camel Corps, Laferung

British Troops in Aden 

 Headquarters, British Troops Aden, Khormaksar commanded by Air vice-marshal Sir George Ranald MacFarlane Reid
 Aden Signal Section, Royal Corps of Signals, Aden
 2nd Battalion, 5th Mahratta Light Infantry, Khormaksar
 Aden Protectorate Levies, Khormaksar
 5th Heavy Regiment, Royal Artillery, Aden
 20th Fortress Company, Royal Engineers, Aden
 Eastern Aden Protectorate
Kathiri Armed Constabulary
 Mukalla Regular Army
 Western Aden Protectorate
 Government Guards
 Tribal Guards
 Lahij Trained Forces

British Troops in Egypt 

 Headquarters, Cairo commanded by Lieutenant General Henry Maitland Wilson
 Egypt Command Signals, Royal Corps of Signals, Cairo
 Delta Area Signal Section, Alexandria
 1st Signal Company
 3rd Signal Company
 1st Light Tank Signal Section
 6th Tank Signal Section
 3rd Battalion, Coldstream Guards, Alexandria
 1st Battalion, The Hampshire Regiment, El Daba
 4th Field Regiment, Royal Horse Artillery
 7th Medium Regiment, Royal Artillery
 19th Heavy Battery, Royal Artillery, Port Said
 42nd Field Company, Royal Engineers
 3rd Company, Royal Army Service Corps
 23rd Company, Royal Army Service Corps
 28th Company, Royal Army Service Corps
 29th Company, Royal Army Service Corps
 37th Company, Royal Army Service Corps
 63rd Company, Royal Army Service Corps
 64th Company, Royal Army Service Corps
 'D' Supply Personnel Company, Royal Army Service Corps, Cairo
 12th Company, Royal Army Ordnance Corps
 33rd Company, Royal Army Medical Corps
 18th Infantry Brigade and HQ Cairo Area
 Headquarters, 18th Inf Bde, Cairo
 1st Battalion, The Bedfordshire and Hertfordshire Regiment, Cairo
 1st Battalion, The Royal Northumberland Fusiliers, Cairo
 Canal Brigade
 Headquarters, Canal Bde, Moascar
 1st Battalion, The Royal Sussex Regiment, Moascar
 1st Battalion, The Essex Regiment, Moascar
 11th Indian Infantry Brigade
 Headquarters, 11th Indian Bde, RAF Fayid
 2nd Battalion, The Cameron Highlanders, RAF Fayid
 1st Battalion, 6th Rajputana Rifles, RAF Fayid
 4th Battalion, 7th Rajput Regiment, RAF Fayid
 4th Field Regiment, Royal Artillery, Mena Camp
 18th Field Company, Bombay Sappers and Miners, Indian Engineers

The Egypt Armoured Division 

 Egypt Armoured Division, Gerwala
 Headquarters, Egypt Armoured Division commanded by Major General Percy Cleghorn Stanley Hobart
 Egypt Divisional Signals, Royal Corps of Signals
 11th Hussars (Prince Albert's Own) (armoured reconnaissance)
 1st Battalion, The King's Royal Rifle Corps (mechanised infantry)
 C Battery, 4th Field Regiment, Royal Artillery
 H Anti-Tank Battery, 3rd Field Regiment, Royal Horse Artillery
 Egypt Divisional Company, Royal Army Service Corps
 Egypt Divisional Field Ambulance, Royal Army Medical Corps
 Egypt Light Armoured Brigade
 Headquarters, Light Armoured Bde, Gerwala
 7th Queen's Own Hussars
 8th King's Royal Irish Hussars
 Egypt Heavy Armoured Brigade
 Headquarters, Heavy Armoured Bde, Gerwala
 1st Royal Tank Regiment (light armoured)
 6th Royal Tank Regiment

7th Infantry Division (Forming) 

 7th Infantry Division, Egypt (forming)
 Headquarters, 7th Infantry Division commanded by Major General Richard Nugent O'Connor
 Cairo Brigade
 Headquarters, Cairo Bde, Mersa Matruh
 2nd Battalion, Scots Guards, Mersa Matruh
 1st Battalion, The Royal East Kent Regiment (Buffs), Mersa Matruh
 Divisional Royal Artillery
 Headquarters, Divisional Royal Artillery
 31st Field Regiment, Royal Artillery, Mersa Matruh
 P Anti-Tank Battery, 3rd Field Regiment, Royal Horse Artillery
 Divisional Royal Engineers
 Headquarters, Divisional Royal Engineers
 2nd Field Company, Royal Engineers
 54th Field Company, Royal Engineers
 56th Field Company, Royal Engineers

British Troops in Palestine and Transjordan 

 Headquarters, British Troops in Palestine and Transjordan, Jerusalem commanded by Lieutenant General Michael Barker
 Transjordan Frontier Force, Zarga
 The Arab Legion, Amman
 17th Heavy Battery, Royal Artillery, Haifa
 45th Fortress Company, Royal Engineers, Palestine
 23rd Company, Royal Army Medical Corps
 Jerusalem Area
 Headquarters, Jerusalem Area, Jerusalem
 Palestine Command Signals, Royal Corps of Signals
 2nd Wireless Signal Company, Royal Corps of Signals, Sarafand al-Amar
 2nd Battalion, The Royal Highland Regiment (The Black Watch)
 2nd Battalion, The City of Glasgow Regiment (Highland Light Infantry)
 2nd Battalion, The King's Own Royal Lancaster Regiment, Hebron
 Lydda Area
 Headquarters, Lydd Area, Lydda
The Royal Scots Greys (2nd Dragoons), Rehovot
 2nd Battalion, The Duke of Wellington's West Riding Regiment, Sarafand al-Amar
 56th Field Company, Royal Engineers
 Detachment, 8th Railway Construction Company, Royal Engineers

8th Infantry Division 

 8th Infantry Division, Jerusalem
 Headquarters, 8th Infantry Division commanded by Major General Alfred Reade Godwin-Austen
 1st Royal Dragoons, Gedera (divisional reconnaissance)
 12th Field Company, Royal Engineers
 Troop, A/E Battery, 1st Regiment Royal Horse Artillery
 Troop, B/O Battery, 1st Regiment Royal Horse Artillery
 14th Infantry Brigade
 Headquarters, 14th Infantry Brigade & Signal Section, Royal Corps of Signals, Nablus
 2nd Battalion, The Prince Consort's Own Rifle Brigade, Nablus Fort
 1st Battalion, Princess Louises's Argyll and Sutherland Highlanders, Jenin
 2nd Battalion, The Queen's Royal West Surrey Regiment, Tulkarm
 16th Infantry Brigade
 Headquarters, 16th Infantry Brigade & Signal Section, Royal Corps of Signals, North Palestine
 1st Battalion, The South Staffordshire Regiment, Nazareth-Tiberias
 1st Battalion, The Welch Regiment, Safed
 2nd Battalion, The Leicestershire Regiment, Acre
 1st Battalion, The Nottinghamshire and Derbyshire Regiment (The Sherwood Foresters), Haifa

British Troops in The Sudan 

 Headquarters, The Sudan, Khartoum commanded by Major General William Platt
 1st Battalion, The Worcestershire Regiment, Wadi Halfa
 2nd Battalion, The York and Lancaster Regiment, Khartoum South
 1st Battalion, The Cheshire Regiment, Khartoum North (Machine-gun)
 Sudan Heavy Detachment, Royal Artillery, Port Sudan
 Sudan Defence Force
 Headquarters, Sudan Defence Force, Khartoum
 Shendi Horse (Northern Area), Shendi
 Equatoria Corps (Southern Area), Torit
 Sudan Camel Corps (Central Area), El-Obeid
 Eastern Arab Corps (Eastern Area), El-Gadarif
 Western Arab Corps (Western Area), Al-Fashir

The Army of India 
The British Indian Army, or as it was known in the British Army as the 'Army of India' was the collective name for all the units and commands of the army based in India (excluding Burma and Ceylon). (ISF) for Imperial Service Force.

 General Headquarters, Army of India Commanded by General Sir Robert Archibald Cassels
 Indian Army Staff College
 Indian Army Senior Officers' School
 Indian School of Artillery
 Indian Military Academy
 Indian Army School of Education
 Indian School of Weapon Training and Mechanisation
 Indian School of Chemical Warfare
 Indian Army School of Physical Training
 Indian Army Signal School
 Kitchener College
 Royal Indian Army Service School
 Indian Mechanical Transport Advisory Committee

Auxiliary Forces, India
The Auxiliary Force (India) (AFI) was a part-time, paid volunteer organisation within the Indian Army in British India. Its units were entirely made up of European and Anglo-Indian personnel.

Cavalry 

 Bihar Light Horse, Muzaffarpur
 Calcutta Light Horse, Calcutta
 Surma Valley Light Horse, Silchar
 Northern Bengal Mounted Rifles, Darjeeling
 Southern Provinces Mounted Rifles, Madras
 The Chota Nagpur Regiment, Ranchi
 Assam Valley Light Horse, Dibrugarh

Infantry 

 Nagpur Rifles, Nagpur
 Simla Rifles, Simla
 The Calcutta and Presidency Battalion, Calcutta
 The Nilgiri Malabar Battalion, Ootacamund
 Hyderabad Rifles, Secunderabad
 The Eastern Bengal Company, Dacca
 East Coast Battalion, Vizayapatam
 Kolar Gold Fields Battalion, Oorgaum
 The Calcutta Scottish, Caluctta
 The Coorg and Mysore Company, Mercara
 The Yercaud Company, Yercaud
 The Bhusawal Company, Bhusawal

Contingents 

 Agra Contingent, Agra
 17th (Agra) Field Battery, Indian Artillery
 5th (Agra) Machine-Gun Company
 Allahabad Contingent, Allahabad
 Detachment, The Southern Regiment (United Provinces Horse)
 Allahabad Rifles
 Bangalore Contingent, Bangalore
 Bangalore Armoured Car Company
 The Bangalore Battalion
 Bareilly Corps, Bareilly
The Bareilly Contingent, Nainital
 18th (Bareilly) Field Battery, Indian Artillery
 Bombay Contingent, Bombay
Bombay Light Patrol
 Bombay Battalion
 10th (Bombay) Battery, Indian Artillery
 3rd (Bombay) Fortress Company, Bombay Engineers
Cawnpore Contingent, Cawnpore
Detachment, The Southern Regiment (United Provinces Horse)
20th (Sawnpore) Field Battery, Indian Artillery
Cawnpore Rifles
Dehra Dun Contingent, Dehradun
3 Platoon, 1 W/T Section and 4 Mortar Platoons
Delhi Contingent, Delhi
HQ, 1 Troop, 1 Company of Infantry, and 3 Mortar Platoons
Karachi Corps, Karachi
Sind Rifles
2nd (Karachi) Machine-Gun Company
3 DLS Sections and 1 W/T Section
2 Mortar Platoons
4th (Karachi) Fortress Company, Indian Engineers
Lucknow Contingent, Lucknow
Detachment, The Southern Regiment (United Provinces Horse)
Lucknow Rifles
13th (Lucknow) Field Battery, Indian Artillery
Madras Contingent, Madras
1st (Madras) Signal Company, Indian Signals
Madras Guards
3rd (Madras) Field Battery, Indian Artillery
Poona Contingent, Poona
Poona Rifles
13th (Kirkee) Field Battery, Indian Artillery Kirkee
Punjab Contingent, Lahore
Punjab Light Horse
Punjab Rifles

Artillery 

 Bengal Artillery, Indian Artillery, Barrackpore
 1st (Calcutta Port Defence) Brigade, Indian Artillery, Calcutta
 5th (Cossipore) Field Battery, Indian Artillery, Cossipore

Engineers 

 1st (Calcutta) Fortress Company, Indian Engineers, Calcutta

Railway Troops 

 East Indian Railway Regiment
 1st Battalion, Liluah
 2nd Battalion, Lucknow
 Eastern Bengal Railway Battalion, Sealdah
 Great Indian Peninsula Railway Regiment
 1st Battalion, Parel
 2nd Battalion, Jhansi
 Bombay, Baroda, and Central India Railway Regiment
 1st Battalion, Lower Parel
 2nd Battalion, Ajmer
 Bengal and North Western Railway Battalion, Gorakhpur
 North Western Railway Battalion, Lahore
 South Indian Railway Battalion, Trichinopoly
 Madras and Southern Mahratta Railway Rifles
 1st Battalion, Perambur
 2nd Battalion, Hubli
 Bengal Nagpur Railway Battalion, Kharagpur
 Assam Bengal Railway Battalion, Chittagong

Western District (Independent) 
Western District encompassed the states of: Baluchistan, Sind, Khairpur State, and Rajputana.

 Western District Headquarters, Quetta commanded by Major General Thomas Jacomb Hutton
 Western District Signals, Indian Army Corps of Signals, Quetta
 20th Mountain Regiment, Indian Artillery, Quetta
 42nd Divisional Engineering Headquarters, Bombay Sappers and Miners, Quetta
 Quetta Area
 Headquarters, Quetta Area, Quetta
 1st Battalion, The Lancashire Fusiliers, Quetta
 1st Battalion, 10th Gurkha Rifles, Quetta
 2nd Battalion, 10th Gurkha Rifles, Quetta
 Khojak Brigade
 Headquarters, Khojak Brigade, Quetta
 Royal Deccan Horse (9th Horse), Quetta
 2nd Battalion, 9th Jat Regiment, Chaman
 3rd Battalion, 18th Royal Garhwal Rifles, Chaman
 Zhob Brigade
 Headquarters, Zhob Brigade, Loralai
 Zhob Signal Section, Indian Army Corps of Signals, Loralai
 2nd Royal Lancers (Gardner's Horse), Loralai
 5th Battalion, 5th Mahratta Light Infantry, Hindubagh
 4th Battalion, 10th Baluch Regiment, Hindubagh
 1st Battalion, 2nd Gurkha Rifles, Fort Sandeman
 2nd Battalion, 4th Gurkha Rifles, Loralai
 Zhob Militia, Fort Sandeman
 25th Mountain Regiment, Indian Artillery, Fort Sandeman
 Sind Area
 Headquarters, Sind Area, Karachi
 B Corps Signals, Indian Army Corps of Signals, Karachi
 D.L.S. Signals Company, Indian Army Corps of Signals, Karachi
 Bikaner Dungar Lancers, Bikaner (ISF)
 Bikaner Camel Corps, Bikaner (ISF)
 1st Battalion, The Royal Scots Fusiliers, Karachi
 3rd Battalion, 7th Rajput Regiment, Hyderabad
 10th Battalion, 10th Baluch Regiment, Karachi
 3rd Battalion, 16th Punjab Regiment, Karachi
 Bikaner Sadul Light Infantry (ISF)
 Bikaner Machine-Gun Battalion, Bikaner (ISF)
 Mekran Levy Corps, Panjgur (ISF)
 11th University Training Corps, Karachi
 Bikaner Camel Escort, Bikaner (ISF)
 13th Heavy Battery, Royal Artillery, Karachi

Northern Command 
Northern Command comprised the areas of: The North-West Frontier Province; Waziristan District; Kashmir State; the Punjab (less districts of Rohtak and Gurgaon); the Punjab States including the Punjab Hill States [less Khairpur, Tehri (Garhwal), Pataudi, Dujana, and the Bawal District of the Nabha State.]

 Headquarters, Northern Command, Rawalpindi commanded by General Sir John Francis Stanhope Duke Coleridge

Kohat District 

 Kohat District, Kohat
 Kohat District Headquarters commanded by Major General Henry Lawrence Haughton
 Kohat District Signals, Indian Army Corps of Signals, Kohat
 8th King George's Own Light Cavalry, Kohat
 21st Mountain Regiment, Indian Artillery, Kohat
 22nd Field Company, Bengal Sappers and Miners, Kohat
 Kohat Base Supply Depot, Kohat
 Thal Brigade
 Headquarters, Thal Brigade
 Detachment, Kohat District Signals, Indian Army Corps of Signals
 1st Battalion, 5th Mahratta Light Infantry
 1st Battalion, 13th Frontier Force Rifles
 2nd Battalion, 15th Punjab Regiment
 Kohat Brigade
 Headquarters, Kohat Brigade
 Troop from 14th Prince of Wales's Own Scinde Horse
 2nd Battalion, 6th Rajputana Rifles
 5th Battalion, 8th Punjab Regiment
 4th Battalion, 13th Frontier Force Rifles
 5th Battalion, 13th Frontier Force Rifles, Latembur

Lahore District 

 Lahore District, Lahore
 Headquarters, Lahore District commanded by Major General Macan Saunders
 Bahawalpar Lancers (ISF), Dera Nawab Sahib
 Jind Bodyguard (ISF), Sangrur
 1st Patiala Lancers (ISF), Patiala
 2nd Patiala Lancers (ISF), Patiala
 Sukhet (Lakshman) Cavalry (ISF), Sundar Nagar
 1st Bahawalpur Battalion (ISF), Dera Nawab Sahib
 2nd Bahawalpur Light Battalion (ISF), Dera Nawab Sahib
 Chamba Bodyguard (ISF), Chamba
 Chamba Battalion (ISF), Chamba
 Faridkot Bodyguard (ISF), Faridkot
 1st Jund Battalion (ISF), Sangrur
 2nd Jind Battalion (ISF), Sangrur
 Kapurthala Bodyguard (ISF), Kapurthala
 1st Kapurthala Battalion (ISF), Kapurthala
 2nd Kapurthala Battalion (ISF), Kapurthala
 Maler Kotla Bodyguard (ISF), Maler Kotla
 Nabha Akal Battalion (ISF), Nabha
 1st Patiala Battalion (ISF), Nabha
 2nd Patiala Battalion (ISF), Nabha
 3rd Patiala Battalion (ISF), Nabha
 4th Patiala Battalion (ISF), Nabha
 Sirmoor Bodyguard (ISF), Nahan
 Sukhet (Lakshman) Battalion (ISF), Sundar Nagar
 Faridkot Sappers and Miners (ISF), Faridkot
 Maler Kotla Sappers and Miners (ISF), Maler Kotla
 Mandi Sappers and Miners (ISF), Mandi
 Sirmoor Sappers and Miners (ISF), Nahan
 Faridkot Sappers and Miners Depot and Reserves (ISF), Faridkot
 Ambala Area
 Headquarters, Ambala
 2nd Battalion, The East Lancashire Regiment, Kasauli
 3rd Battalion, 14th Punjab Regiment, Ambala
 10th Battalion, 15th Punjab Regiment
 11th (Territorial) Battalion, 15th Punjab Regiment
 Mountain Artillery Training Centre
 Indian Survey Section, Kakul
 Ferozepore Area
 Headquarters, Ferozepore
 12th Cavalry Training Regiment
 2nd Battalion, The Duke of Wellington's West Riding Regiment
 2nd Battalion, Alexandra, Princess of Wales's Own North Yorkshire Regiment
 2nd Battalion, 1st Punjab Regiment
 5th Battalion, 10th Baluch Regiment
 10th Battalion, 14th Punjab Regiment
U Field Battery, Royal Artillery
 23/24th Medium Battery, Royal Artillery
 Jullundur Area
 Headquarters, Jalandhar
 2nd Lancers (Gardner's Horse) (armoured reconnaissance)
 1st Battalion, The East Yorkshire Regiment
 10th Battalion, 17th Dogra Regiment
 1st Battalion, 1st Gorkha Rifles (The Malaun Regiment), Dharamshala
 11th (Territorial) Battalion, 17th Dogra Regiment
R Field Battery, Royal Artillery
 Lahore Area
 Headquarters, Lahore
 19th King George's Own Lancers
 1st Battalion, The Duke of Cornwall's Light Infantry
 10th Battalion, 8th Punjab Regiment
 3rd Battalion, 17th Dogra Regiment
 4th University Infantry Corps (ITF), Lahore
 15th Field Regiment, Royal Artillery
 Sealkot Area
 Headquarters, Sialkot
 3rd Carabiniers (Prince of Wales's Dragoon Guards), Khanaspur
 13th Duke of Connaught's Lancers (armoured reconnaissance)
 10th Battalion, 12th Frontier Force Regiment
 10th Battalion, 16th Punjab Regiment

Peshawar District 

 Peshawar District, Peshawar
 Headquarters, Peshawar District commanded by Major General Chauncey Batho Dashwood Strettell
 Gilgit Scouts, Gilgit
 1st Light Tank Company, Royal Tank Regiment
 7th Light Tank Company, Royal Tank Regiment
 Chitrai Force, Chitral Fort
 1st Battalion, 9th Jat Regiment
 Chitral Mountain Artillery Section, Indian Artillery
 Section, 22nd Field Company, Bombay Sappers and Miners
 1st (Risalpur) Cavalry Brigade
 Headquarters and Signal Company, Royal Corps of Signals
 16th/5th The Queen's Royal Lancers
 5th King Edward's Own Probyn's Horse
 10th Queen Victoria's Own Corps of Guides Cavalry
 5th Battalion, 12th Frontier Force Regiment
Landi Kotal Brigade
Headquarters, Landi Kotal
Detachment, Pesawar District Signals, Indian Army Corps of Signals
1st Battalion, The South Wales Borderers, Landi Kotal
1st Battalion, 1st Punjab Regiment
3rd Battalion, 9th Jat Regiment, Bar Fortress
4th Battalion, 11th Sikh Regiment
4th Battalion, 15th Punjab Regiment, Shagi
2nd Battalion, 5th Gorkha Rifles (Frontier Force)
Kurram Militia
Nowshera Brigade
Headquarters, Nowshera
4th Battalion, 5th Mahratta Light Infantry
2nd Battalion, 11th Sikh Regiment
10th Battalion, 11th Sikh Regiment
1st Battalion, 6th Gurkha Rifles, Malakand
Detachment, 5th Battalion, 12th Frontier Force Regiment
11th (Territorial) Battalion, 12th Frontier Force Regiment
1st Field Regiment, Royal Artillery
2nd Field Company, Bengal Sappers and Miners
Peshawar Brigade
Headquarters, Peshawar
Peshawar District Signals, Indian Army Corps of Signals
16th Light Cavalry
1st Battalion, The King's Liverpool Regiment
3rd Battalion, 6th Rajputana Rifles
4th Battalion, 8th Punjab Regiment
4th Battalion, 14th Punjab Regiment
2nd Battalion, 19th Hyderabad Regiment
8th Anti-Aircraft Battery, Royal Artillery
19th Medium Battery, Royal Artillery
24th Mountain Regiment, Indian Artillery
18th (Sohan) Mountain Battery, Indian Artillery

Rawalpindi District 

 Rawalpindi District, Rawalpindi
 Headquarters, Rawalpindi District commanded by Major General Alan Fleming Hartley
 11th (Territorial) Battalion, 13th Frontier Force Rifles
 73rd Field Battery, Royal Artillery, Campbellpore
 7x Fort Guards provided by Jammu and Kashmir Rifles (ISF)
 1st (Abbottabad) Infantry Brigade
 Headquarters, Abbottabad
 1st Battalion, 5th Gorkha Rifles (Frontier Force)
 2nd Battalion, 6th Gurkha Rifles
 10th Battalion, 13th Frontier Force Rifles
 23rd Mountain Regiment, Indian Artillery
 2nd (Rawalpindi) Infantry Brigade
 Headquarters, Rawalpindi
 A Corps Signals, Indian Army Corps of Signals
 1st Indian Divisional Signals, Indian Army Corps of Signals
 Headquarters Squadron, 14th Prince of Wales's Own Scinde Horse
 1st Battalion, The Devonshire Regiment
 1st Battalion, The Royal Ulster Rifles
 2nd Battalion, The Worcestershire Regiment
 2nd Battalion, 4th Bombay Grenadiers
 2nd Battalion, 8th Punjab Regiment
 4th Battalion, 12th Frontier Force Regiment
 5th Field Regiment, Royal Artillery
 5th Field Company, Bengal Sappers and Miners
 41st Divisional Headquarters Company, Bengal Sappers and Miners
 3rd (Jhelum) Infantry Brigade
 Headquarters, Jhelum
 10th Battalion, 1st Punjab Regiment
 1st Battalion, 10th Baluch Regiment
 1st Battalion, 16th Punjab Regiment
 1st Battalion, 17th Dogra Regiment
 11th (Territorial) Battalion, 1st Punjab Regiment
 Jammu Brigade (ISF)
 Headquarters, Jammu Cantonment
 5th Squadron, Jammu and Kashmir Bodyguard
 1st Battalion, Jammu and Kashmir Rifles
 2nd Battalion, Jammu and Kashmir Rifles
 6th Battalion, Jammu and Kashmir Rifles
 7th Battalion, Jammu and Kashmir Rifles
 Jammu and Kashmir Infantry Training Battalion
 1st Mountain Battery, Jammu and Kashmir Artillery
 2nd Mountain Battery, Jammu and Kashmir Artillery
 Jammu and Kashmir Service Company
 Jammu and Kashmir Training School
 Kashmir Brigade (ISF)
 Headquarters, Srinagar
 Jammu and Kashmir Bodyguard (-5th Sqn)
 3rd Battalion, Jammu and Kashmir Rifles
 4th Battalion, Jammu and Kashmir Rifles
 5th Battalion, Jammu and Kashmir Light Infantry

Waziristan District 

 Waziristan District, Dera Ismail Khan
 Headquarters, Waziristan District command by Major General Edward Pellew Quinan
 Waziristan District Signals, Indian Army Corps of Signals
 Detachment, 2nd Battalion, 11th Sikh Regiment, Mari Indus
 Bannu Brigade
 Headquarters, Bannu Brigade, Bannu
 Bannu Brigade Signals, Indian Army Corps of Signals
 1st Duke of York's Own Cavalry (Skinner's Horse)
 C Squadron, 14th Prince of Wales's Own Scinde Horse
 5th Battalion, 1st Punjab Regiment
 1st Battalion, 12th Frontier Force Regiment
 2nd Battalion, 12th Frontier Force Regiment, Mir Ali
 1st Battalion, 14th Punjab Regiment
 1st Battalion, 4th Gorkha Rifles, Damdil
 Tochi Scouts, Miramshah
 Base Engineer Park
 Razmak Brigade
 Headquarters, Razmak Brigade, Razmak
 Razmak Brigade Signals, Indian Army Corps of Signals
 B Squadron, 14th Prince of Wales's Own Scinde Horse (armoured reconnaissance)
 11th Light Tank Company, Royal Tank Regiment
 1st Battalion, The Leicestershire Regiment
 2nd Battalion, 7th Rajput Regiment
 3rd Battalion, 10th Baluch Regiment
 5th Battalion, 11th Sikh Regiment
 2nd Battalion, 1st Gorkha Rifles (The Malaun Regiment)
 1st Battalion, 8th Gorkha Rifles
 25th Mountain Regiment, Royal Artillery
 10th Field Company, Madras Sappers and Miners
 Wanna Brigade
 Headquarters, Wana Brigade, Wanna
 Detachment, Waziristan District Signals, Indian Army Corps of Signals
 A Squadron, 14th Prince of Wales's Own Scinde Horse, Manzai
 2nd Battalion, 2nd Punjab Regiment
 3rd Battalion, 8th Punjab Regiment
 1st Battalion, 18th Royal Garhwal Rifles
 2nd Battalion, 3rd Gorkha Rifles
 2nd Battalion, 8th Gorkha Rifles
 South Waziristan Scouts
 3rd Field Company, Bengal Sappers and Miners
 9th Field Company, Madras Sappers and Miners
 19th Field Company, Bombay Sappers and Miners

Eastern Command 
Eastern Command comprising: Delhi Province; Rohtak and Gurgaon districts, the United Provinces; Rajputana (less States of Jaisalmer, Jodhpur, Udaipur, Sirohi, Danta, Palanpur, Banswara, Partabgarh, Dungarpur, Shahpura, Kushalgarh, Nimbahera (Tonk); the combined Bundelkhand and Bagelkhand Agency of Central India; Piklon (Bhopal); Gwalior State (less detached Districts in Southern Command); Bihar and Orissa Province; Eastern States Agency (less States of Basar, Changbakhar, Chhuikhadan, Jashpur, Kanker, Kawardha, Khairagarh, Korea, Nandgaon, Raigarh, Sakti, Sarangarh, Surguja (Udaipur and Makrai); Bengal, Bengal States; Assam and Manipur States. Of the Punjab states; Pataudi, Dujana, Tehri (Garhwal) and the Bawal District of the Nabha State.

 Headquarters, Eastern Command, Nainital commanded by General Sir Harry Beauchamp Douglas Baird

Lucknow District 

 Lucknow District, Lucknow
 Headquarters, Lucknow District commanded by Major General Francis Lothian Nicholson
 1st Benares Battalion (ISF), Ramnagar
 2nd Benares Cavalry Squadron (ISF), Ramnagar
 6th (Lucknow) Infantry Brigade
 Headquarters, 6th Inf Bde, Lucknow
 20th Lancers (Training Regiment)
 2nd Battalion, The Royal Welch Fusiliers
 2nd Battalion, Princess Charlotte of Wales's Royal Berkshire Regiment
 3rd Battalion, 2nd Punjab Regiment
 1st Battalion, 8th Punjab Regiment
 2nd Battalion, 10th Baluch Regiment, Fyzabad
 1st Battalion, 3rd Gorkha Rifles
 8th Field Regiment, Royal Artillery
 Allahabad Area
 Headquarters, Allahabad Area, Allahabad
 Squadron from 3rd Cavalry
 1st Battalion, The Queen's Royal West Surrey Regiment
 2nd Battalion, The South Staffordshire Regiment, Kanpur
 10th Battalion, 7th Rajput Regiment
 11th (Territorial) Battalion, 7th Rajput Regiment, Fatehgarh
 3rd Battalion, 11th Sikh Regiment, Fatehgarh
 4th (United Provinces) Urban Battalion (ITF)
 3rd (United Provinces) University Training Corps (ITF)
 X Field Battery, Royal Artillery, Kanpur
 Delhi Area (Independent)
 Headquarters, Delhi Area, Delhi Cantonment
 6th Duke of Connaught's Own Lancers (Watson's Horse)
 Alwar Mangal Lancers (ISF), Alwar
 Kachhawa Horse (ISF), Jaipur
 1st Battalion, The Royal Norfolk Regiment
 2nd Battalion, The Welch Regiment, Agra
 11th (Territorial) Battalion, 6th Rajputana Rifles, Agra
 2nd Battalion, 16th Punjab Regiment
 10th Battalion, 19th Hyderabad Regiment, Agra
 Alwar Jey Paltan Battalion (ISF), Alwar
 Alwar Pratap Paltan Battalion (ISF), Alwar
 Dholpur Narsingh Battalion (ISF), Dholpur
 Sawai Man Guards Battalion (ISF), Jaipur
 1st Battalion, Jaipur Infantry (ISF), Jaipur
 2nd Battalion, Jaipur Infantry (ISF), Jaipur
 1st Umed Battalion, Kotah
 9th (Delhi) Battalion, University Training Corps (ITF)
 6th Medium Regiment, Royal Artillery
 Royal Artillery Indian Training Centre, Muttra
 Indian Artillery Training Battery, Royal Artillery, Muttra

Meerut District 

 Meerut District, Dehradun
 Headquarters, Meerut District commanded by Major General Claude John Eyre Auchinleck
 Rampur Lancers (Territorial), Rampur
 Governor General's Bodyguard, Dehradun
 Datia 1st Govind Battalion (Territorial), Datia (B Company training unit)
 Panna Chhatrasal (Territorial), Panna
 1st Rampur Battalion (Territorial), Rampur
 2nd Rampur Battalion (Territorial), Rampur
 Rewa Battalion (Territorial), Rewa
 Tehri Infantry Battalion & Band (Territorial), Tehri
 31st Field Engineer Platoon, King George V's Own Bengal Sappers and Miners, Roorkee
 35th Field Engineer Platoon, King George V's Own Bengal Sappers and Miners, Roorkee
 4th Field Company, King George V's Own Bengal Sappers and Miners, Roorkee
 51st Printing Platoon, King George V's Own Bengal Sappers and Miners, Roorkee
 6th Army Troops Company, King George V's Own Bengal Sappers and Miners, Roorkee
 8th Army Troops Company, King George V's Own Bengal Sappers and Miners, Roorkee
 43rd Divisional Headquarters Company Company, King George V's Own Bengal Sappers and Miners, Roorkee
 Training Battalion, King George V's Own Bengal Sappers and Miners, Roorkee
 Tehri-Garhwal Sappers and Miners (Territorial), Tehri
 Narendra Pioneers (Territorial), Tehri
 3rd (Meerut) Cavalry Brigade
 Headquarters, 3rd Cav Bde, Meerut
 3rd Indian Divisional Signals, Indian Army Corps of Signals
 3rd Cavalry Brigade Signals, Indian Army Corps of Signals
 18th King Edward VIII's Own Cavalry
 21st King George V's Own Central India Horse (armoured reconnaissance)
 1st Battalion, The Royal Warwickshire Regiment
 10th Battalion, 2nd Punjab Regiment
 11th (Territorial) Battalion, 9th Jat Regiment
 11th Field Regiment, Royal Artillery
 Gwalior Cavalry Brigade (ISF)
 Headquarters, Gwailor Cav Bde
 1st Gwalior Lancers, Guna
 2nd Gwalior Lancers, Thatipur
 3rd Gwalior Lancers, Morar
 B Battery, Gwalior Horse Artillery, Morar
 7th (Dehra Dun) Infantry Brigade
 Headquarters, 7th Inf Bde, Dehradun
 2nd Battalion, 2nd Gurkha Rifles
 1st Battalion, 9th Gorkha Rifles
 2nd Battalion, 9th Gorkha Rifles
 8th (Bareilly) Infantry Brigade
 Headquarters, 8th Inf Bde, Bareilly
 2nd Battalion, The Oxfordshire and Buckinghamshire Light Infantry
 10th Battalion, 9th Jat Regiment
 2nd Battalion, 18th Royal Garhwal Rifles
 10th Battalion, 18th Royal Garhwal Rifles, Lansdowne
 11th (Territorial) Battalion, 18th Royal Garhwal Rifles, Lansdowne
 84th Field Battery, Royal Artillery
 9th (Jhansi) Infantry Brigade
 Headquarters, 9th Inf Bde, Jhansi
 15th Lancers (Training regiment)
 1st Battalion, The City of London Regiment (Royal Fusiliers)
 3rd Battalion, 1st Punjab Regiment
 4th Battalion, 6th Rajputana Rifles
 3rd Battalion, 15th Punjab Regiment
 11th (Territorial) Battalion, 14th Punjab Regiment
 25th Field Regiment, Royal Artillery
 Gwalior Infantry Brigade (ISF)
 Headquarters, Gwalior Inf Bde, Gwalior
 1st Gwalior Infantry Battalion, Lashkar Kampoo
 2nd Gwalior Infantry Battalion, Lashkar Kampoo
 3rd Gwalior Infantry Battalion, Morar
 4th Gwalior Infantry Battalion, Morar
 7th Gwalior (Training) Infantry Battalion, Morar
 Gwalior Mountain Artillery Battery, Morar

Presidency & Assam District 

 Presidency & Assam District, Jalapahar
 Headquarters, Presidency and Assam District commanded by Major General Cecil Albert Heydeman
 Governor General's Bodyguard (Bengal), Calcutta
 2nd Battalion, The Border Regiment, Calcutta
 1st Battalion, The Scottish Rifles (Cameronians), Barrackpore
 1st Battalion, The Northamptonshire Regiment, Danapur
 1st Battalion, 4th Bombay Grenadiers, Midnapore
 1st Battalion, 15th Punjab Regiment, Alipore
 11th (Territorial) Battalion, 19th Hyderabad Regiment, Dinapore
 1st Battalion, 7th Gurkha Rifles, Digboi
 2nd Battalion, 7th Gurkha Rifles, Shillong
 5th (Bengal Presidency) Urban Infantry Battalion (Territorial), Calcutta
 2nd (Calcutta) University Training Corps Battalion (Territorial), Calcutta
 7th (Patna) University Training Corps Company (Territorial), Patna
 Tripur (Bir Bikram) Manikya Rifles (ISF), Agartala
 Eastern Bengal Area
 Headquarters, Eastern Bengal Area, Shillong
 1st Battalion, Assam Rifles, Aijal
 2nd Battalion, Assam Rifles, Sadiya
 3rd Battalion, Assam Rifles, Kohima
 4th Battalion, Assam Rifles, Imphal
 1st Battalion, 11th Sikh Regiment, Chittagong
 2nd Battalion, 14th Punjab Regiment, Dacca
 12th (Dacca) University Training Corps Company (Territorial), Dacca

Southern Command 
Southern Command comprised the areas of the Western India States Agency – Central India States Agency (less combined Bundelkhand and Baghelkhand Agency) – Ajmer-Merwara – Jodhpur – Udaipur, Sirohi, Danta, Palanpur, Banswara, Partabgarh, Shahpurg, Kushalgarh, Nimbahera (Tonk) and Dungarpur States of Rajputana – Ujjain, Amjhera, Shajapur, and Mandasar districts of Gwalior State – Bombay Presidency – Gujarat States Agency including Baroda State – Deccan State Agency, including Kolhapur State – Central Provinces – Bastar Changbakhar, Chhuikadan Jashpur, Kanker, Karwardho, Khairagarh, Korea, Nandgaon, Raigarh, Sakti, Sarangarh, Surguja, Udaipur and Makrai States of the Eastern States Agency – Hyderababd State, Madras Presidency – Mysore State and Madras States Agency.

 Southern Command Headquarters, Poona commanded by General Sir John Edward Spencer Brind

Bombay District 

 Bombay District, Bombay
 Headquarters, Bombay District commanded by Major General Guy de Courcy Glover
 Bombay Governor's Bodyguard
 Baria Subhag Risala (ISF), Devgadh Baria
 2nd Baroda Lancers (ISF), Baroda
 Bhavnagar Lancers (ISF), Bhavnagar
 Dhar Light Horse (ISF), Dharavi
 Jodhpur Lancers (ISF), Jodhpur
 Janagarh Lancers (ISF), Junagarh
 Mewar Lancers (ISF), Udaipur
 Nawanagar Lancers (ISF), Jamnagar
 Porbandar Bodyguard (ISF), Porbandar
 Rajpipla Bodyguard (ISF), Rajpipla
 2nd Battalion, The Prince of Wales's South Lancashire Volunteers
 11th (Territorial) Battalion, 4th Bombay Grenadiers, Ajmer
 3rd Battalion, 5th Mahratta Light Infantry
 3rd Battalion, 12th Frontier Force Regiment, Baroda
 1st Battalion, 19th Hyderabad Regiment, Ahmedabad
 2nd (Bombay Presidency) Urban Infantry Battalion (Territorial)
 1st (Bombay) University Training Corps (Territorial)
 Alirajpur Pratap Battalion (ISF), Alirajpur
 Baria Ranjit Battalion (ISF), Devgadh Baria
 1st Baroda Battalion (ISF), Baroda
 2nd Baroda Battalion (ISF), Baroda
 Bhavnagar Battalion (ISF), Bhavnagar
 Bhopal Sultania Battalion (ISF), Bhopal
 Dhar Battalion (ISF), Dhar
 Dhrangadhar Bodyguard (ISF), Dhrangadhra
 Idar Battalion (ISF), Himatnagar
 1st Battalion, The Indor Regiment (ISF), Indore
 Jodhpur Sardar Battalion (ISF), Jodhpur
 Janagarh Battalion (ISF), Junagarh
 Kutch Bodyguard (ISF), Bhuj
 Kutch Battalion (ISF), Bhuj
 Mewar Bhupal Battalion (ISF), Udaipur
 Mewar Sajjan Battalion (ISF), Udaipur
 Nawanagar Battalion (ISF), Jamnagar
 Palanpur Iqbal Battalion (ISF), Palanpur
 Porbandar Battalion (ISF), Porbandar
 Rajpipla Battalion (ISF), Rajpipla
 Ratlam Lokendra Rifles (ISF), Ratlam
 Bhopal Goshar-i-Taj Own Infantry Training Company (ISF), Bhopal
 Mewar Chupal Infantry Training Company (ISF), Udaipur
 Indor Holkar's Mounted Escort (ISF), Indore
 Mhow Area
 Headquarters, Mhow Area, Mhow
 1st Battalion, The Lincolnshire Regiment, Nasirabad
 2nd Battalion, The Suffolk Regiment
 1st Battalion, The Prince of Wales's Own West Yorkshire Regiment, Nasirabad
 6th Field Regiment, Royal Artillery (cadre only)
 28th Field Regiment, Royal Artillery

Deccan District 

 Deccan District, Bolarum
 Headquarters, Deccan District commanded by Major General P. Gerald Scarlett
 4th Indian Divisional Signals, Indian Army Corps of Signals
 1st Hyderabad Lancers (ISF), Asif Nagar
 2nd Hyderabad Lancers (ISF), Golconda Fort
 3rd Hyderabad Lancers (ISF), Golconda Fort
 Hyderabad Cavalry Depot Squadron (ISF), Asafnagar
 5th Battalion, 6th Rajputana Rifles, Secunderabad
 6th Battalion, 13th Frontier Force Rifles, Secunderabad
 1st Hyderabad Battalion (ISF), Goshamahal
 2nd Hyderabad Battalion (ISF), Chandrayan Gutta
 3rd Hyderabad Battalion (ISF), Saifabad
 Sajian Singh Battalion (ISF), Mudhol
 10th (Nagpur) University Training Corps (Territorial), Nagpur
 Hyderabad Infantry Training Company (ISF), Nampally
 A Battery, Hyderabad Horse Artillery (ISF), Mullahalli
 Poona Area (Independent)
 Headquarters, Poona Area, Poona (GHQ unit)
 17th Queen Victoria's Own Cavalry (Poona Horse)
 Royal Tank Regiment Depot (India), Kirkee
 1st Battalion, Prince Albert's Somerset Light Infantry
 1st Battalion, The Prince of Wales's North Staffordshire Regiment
 10th Battalion, 5th Mahratta Light Infantry, Belgaum
 11th (Territorial) Battalion, 5th Mahratta Light Infantry, Belgaum
 4th Battalion, 16th Punjab Regiment
 Training Battalion, King George V's Bombay Sappers and Miners, Kirkee
 17th Field Company, King George V's Bombay Sappers and Miners, Kirkee
 20th Field Company, King George V's Bombay Sappers and Miners, Kirkee
 21st Field Company, King George V's Bombay Sappers and Miners, Kirkee
 55th Printing Section, King George V's Bombay Sappers and Miners, Kirkee
 4th (Secunderabad) Cavalry Brigade
 Headquarters, 4th Cav Bde, Bolarum
 4th Cavalry Brigade Signal Squadron, Indian Army Corps of Signals
 Squadron from 14th/20th King's Hussars, Secunderabad
 7th Light Cavalry
 11th Prince Albert Victor's Own Cavalry (Frontier Force)
 3rd Field Regiment, Royal Artillery, Trimulgherry
 10th (Jubbulpore) Infantry Brigade
 Headquarters, 10th Inf Bde, Jubbulpore
 Signal Training Centre, Royal Corps of Signals (India), Jubbulpore
 3rd Cavalry
 2nd Battalion, The King's Own Scottish Borderers
 1st Battalion, 2nd Punjab Regiment
 1st Battalion, 7th Rajput Regiment, Kamptee

Madras District 

 Madras District, Bangalore
 Headquarters, Madras District commanded by Major General Edward Felix Norton
 Mysore Lancers Training Squadron, Bangalore
 2nd Mysore Training Squadron, Bangalore
 1st Battalion, The King's Own Royal Lancaster Regiment, Madras
 1st Battalion, The Duke of Edinburgh's Wiltshire Regiment
 1st Battalion, The Royal Inniskilling Fusiliers, Wellington
 5th Battalion, 7th Rajput Regiment, Cannanore
 2nd Battalion, 13th Frontier Force Rifles, St Thomas Mount
 Madras Governor's Bodyguard, Madras
 3rd Urban Infantry Battalion (Territorial), Madras
 5th Battalion, University Training Corps (Territorial), Madras
 14th Coorg (Territorial) Battalion, 3rd Madras Regiment, Mercara
 12th Malabar (Territorial) Battalion, 3rd Madras Regiment, Cannanore
 Malabar Special Police, Cannanore
 1st Battalion, Mysore Regiment (ISF), Bangalore
 3rd Battalion, Mysore Regiment (ISF), Mysore
 Mahraja's Bodyguard, Trivandrum
 1st Battalion, Travancore Nair Army, Trivandrum
 2nd Battalion, Travancore Nair Army, Trivandrum
 3rd Battalion, Travancore Nair Army, Trivandrum
 A Field Regiment, Indian Artillery
 32nd Field Platoon, Queen Victoria's Own Madras Sappers and Miners, Bangalore
 35th Field Troop, Queen Victoria's Own Madras Sappers and Miners, Bangalore
 12th Field Company, Queen Victoria's Own Madras Sappers and Miners, Bangalore
 14th Field Company, Queen Victoria's Own Madras Sappers and Miners, Bangalore
 11th Army Troops Company, Queen Victoria's Own Madras Sappers and Miners, Bangalore
 16th Army Troops Company, Queen Victoria's Own Madras Sappers and Miners, Bangalore
 44th Divisional Headquarters Company, Queen Victoria's Own Madras Sappers and Miners, Bangalore
 A Depot, Queen Victoria's Own Madras Sappers and Miners, Bangalore
 Training Battalion, Queen Victoria's Own Madras Sappers and Miners, Bangalore

Army in Burma 
BAF - Burma Auxiliary Forces or BFF - Burma Frontier Force

 Headquarters, Army in Burma, Rangoon commanded by Major General Donald Kenneth McLeod
 Rangoon Brigade
 Headquarters, Rangoon Bde, Rangoon
 1st Battalion, The Gloucestershire Regiment, Mingaladon
 1st Battalion, Burma Rifles, Mingaladon
 12th (Territorial) Battalion, Burma Rifles, Mingaladon
 Rangoon Battalion (BAF)
 Tenasserim Battalion (BAF), Moulmein
 Rangoon University Training Corps (Territorial)
 Rangoon Field Brigade, Royal Artillery (BAF), Dry Tree Point
 Burma Railways Engineer Battalion (BAF)
 1st Rangoon Military Police Battalion
 2nd Rangoon Military Police Battalion
Mandalay Brigade
Headquarters, Mandalay Bde, Maymyo
2nd Battalion, The King's Own South Yorkshire Light Infantry
2nd Battalion, Burma Rifles
3rd Battalion, Burma Rifles
4th Battalion, Burma Rifles, Mandalay
11th (Territorial) Battalion, Burma Rifles, Mandalay
Upper Burma Battalion (BAF)
Southern Shan States Battalion (BFF), Tvanggyi
Northern Shan States Battalion (BFF), Lashio
Bhamo Battalion (BFF), Bhamo
Chin Hills Battalion (BFF), Falam
Myitkyina Battalion (BFF), Myitkyina
Reserve Battalion (BFF), Pyawbwe
2nd Mountain Battery, Indian Artillery
1st Field Company, Burma Sappers and Miners
13th Field Company, Madras Sappers and Miners
Mandalay Burma Military Police Battalion, Mandalay

Atlantic Region 
The Atlantic region covered: Falkland Islands, Newfoundland (still under control of the British at this point, not part of Canada yet), Saint Helena, and Bermuda.

 Falklands
 Falkland Islands Defence Force, Port Stanley
 Newfoundland
 Newfoundland Militia, Saint John's
 Saint Helena
 Saint Helena Rifles
 Bermuda
 Company detached from the 2nd Battalion, The King's Shropshire Light Infantry
 Bermuda Volunteer Rifle Corps
 Bermuda Volunteer Engineers (attached)
 Bermuda Militia
 Bermuda Militia Artillery
 Bermuda Detachment, Royal Engineers

Caribbean 
The Caribbean region covered: Barbados, Jamaica, Trinidad and Tobago, Grenada, Saint Lucia, and Saint Vincent.

 Barbados
 Barbados Volunteer Force
 Jamaica
 Jamaica Signal Section, Royal Corps of Signals
 2nd Battalion, The King's Shropshire Light Infantry (less company in Bermuda)
 2nd Heavy Battery, Royal Artillery, defending Kingston and Port Royal (cadre)
 Jamaica Militia Artillery, defending Kingston and Port Royal 
 44th Fortress Company, Royal Engineers
 Jamaica Engineer Corps
 Leeward Islands
 Antigua Defence Force, Antigua
 Dominica Defence Force, Dominica
 Montserrat Defence Force, Montserrat
 Saint Kitts and Nevis Defence Force, Basseterre
 Trinidad
 Trinidad Light Horse
 Trinidad Light Infantry
 Trinidad Volunteer Reserve of Europeans
 Trinidad Volunteer Artillery,
 Windward Islands
 Grenada Volunteer Corps, Grenada
 Saint Lucia Volunteer Corps, Saint Lucia
 Saint Vincent Volunteer Corps, Saint Vincent

South America 
The South America Region covered the areas of British Guiana and British Honduras.

 British Guiana
 British Guiana Militia
 British Guiana Militia Artillery (defending Georgetown)
 British Hondouras (today known as Belize)
 British Honduras Defense Force

Mediterranean Region 
The Mediterranean Region consisted of the colonies which were NOT part of Middle East Command. These regions included: Gibraltar, Malta, Cyprus, and Iraq.

Gibraltar 

 Headquarters, British Troops on Gibraltar commanded by the Governor of Gibraltar Sir Clive Gerard Liddell
 Gibraltar Signal Section, Royal Corps of Signals
 1st Battalion, Welsh Guards
 2nd Battalion, The King's Liverpool Regiment
 2nd Battalion, Prince Albert's Somerset Light Infantry
 Gibraltar Defence Force
 31st Company, Royal Army Service Corps
 28th Company, Royal Army Medical Corps
 Gibraltar Royal Artillery
 HQ Gibraltar RA, South Gibraltar
 3rd Heavy Regiment, Royal Artillery (coastal defence)
 19th Heavy Anti-Aircraft Battery, Artillery
 Gibraltar Royal Engineers
 HQ Gibraltar RE
 1st Fortress Company, Royal Engineers
 32nd Fortress Company, Royal Engineers

Malta 

 Headquarters, Malta Command commanded by Governor of Malta General Sir Charles Bonham-Carter
 Malta Signal Section, Royal Corps of Signals
 1st Battalion, The King's Own Malta Regiment, Lower Saint Elmo
 Royal Malta Artillery, Upper Saint Elmo
 4th Malta Battery, Royal Malta Artillery
 30th Company, Royal Army Service Corps
 30th Company, Royal Army Medical Corps
 Malta Brigade
 Headquarters, Malta Bde, Valletta
 2nd Battalion, The Devonshire Regiment
 1st Battalion, The Dorset Regiment
 2nd Battalion, The Queen's Own Royal West Kent Regiment
 2nd Battalion, Princess Victoria's Royal Irish Fusiliers
 Malta Royal Artillery
 Headquarters, Malta RA
 4th Heavy Regiment, Royal Artillery (coastal defence)
 26th Anti-Tank Regiment, Royal Artillery
 7th Heavy Anti-Aircraft Regiment, Royal Artillery
 Malta Royal Engineers
 Headquarters, Malta RE
 16th Fortress Company, Royal Engineers
 24th Fortress Company, Royal Engineers

Iraq 

 Iraq Levies, Habbaniyah

Cyprus 

 Cyprus Signal Section, Royal Corps of Signals
 C Company, 1st Battalion, The Essex Regiment, Nicosia
 D Company, 1st Battalion, The Nottinghamshire and Derbyshire Regiment (The Sherwood Foresters)

China Command 
China Command covered the British interests in: Hong Kong, Shanghai, and Tientsin.

 China Command, Hong Kong
 Headquarters, China Command commanded by Governor of Hong Kong General Sir Geoffry Alexander Stafford Northcote
 Hong Kong Command Signal Company, Royal Corps of Signals
 8th Heavy Regiment, Royal Artillery, Kowloon (including X Bty from the HKSRA)
 1st Regiment, Hong Kong and Singapore Royal Artillery, Kowloon
 5th Heavy Anti-Aircraft Regiment, Royal Artillery, RAF Kai Tak
 22nd Fortress Company, Royal Engineers (serving Shenzhen River)
 40th Fortress Company, Royal Engineers (serving the Harbour Installations)
 10th Company, Royal Army Service Corps
 6th Company, Royal Army Ordnance Corps
 27th Company, Royal Army Medical Corps
 Hong Kong Infantry Brigade
 Headquarters, Hong Kong Inf Bde, Hong Kong
 2nd Battalion, The Royal Scots (Lothian Regiment)
 Kumaon Rifles
 1st Battalion, The Duke of Cambridge's Own Middlesex Regiment, Sham Shui Po (machine-gun)
 Hong Kong Volunteer Defence Corps
 Hong Kong Volunteer Defence Corps Signal Company
 Hong Kong Volunteer Defence Corps Armoured Car Platoon
 1st Company, Hong Kong Volunteer Defence Corps, RAF Kai Tak
 2nd (Scottish) Company, Hong Kong Volunteer Defence Corps, Sheko
 3rd (Eurasian) Company, Hong Kong Volunteer Defence Corps, Stonecutters Island
 4th (Chinese) Company, Hong Kong Volunteer Defence Corps, High West
 5th Company, Hong Kong Volunteer Defence Corps, Mount Davis
 6th (Portuguese) Company, Hong Kong Volunteer Defence Corps, North Shin Naval Yard
 7th Company, Hong Kong Volunteer Defence Corps, Magasin Gap
 Stanley Platoon, Hong Kong Volunteer Defence Corps, Stanley
 The Hugh's Group (Highsiliers), Hong Kong Volunteer Defence Corps, Northern Point
 1st Battery, Hong Kong Volunteer Defence Corps, Cape D'Aguilar
 2nd Battery, Hong Kong Volunteer Defence Corps, Bluff Head
 3rd Battery, Hong Kong Volunteer Defence Corps, Aberdeen Island
 4th Battery, Hong Kong Volunteer Defence Corps, Pak Sha Wan
 5th (Anti-Aircraft) Battery, Hong Kong Volunteer Defence Corps, Sai Wan Hill
 Field Engineer Company, Hong Kong Volunteer Defence Corps, Fanling
 Army Service Corps Company, Hong Kong Volunteer Defence Corps, Deepwater Bay

Shanghai Area 

 Shanghai Area, Shanghai
 Headquarters, Shanghai Area commanded by Major General Frank Keith Simmons
 Shanghai Area Signal Section, Royal Corps of Signals
 1st Battalion, The Duke of Albany's Seaforth Highlanders (Ross-shire Buffs)
 2nd Battalion, The East Surrey Regiment
 Shanghai Area Detachment, Royal Engineers
 Shanghai Volunteer Corps
 Headquarters, Shanghai Volunteer Corps, Shanghai
 Shanghai Light Horse
 American Troop (cavalry)
 Armoured Car Company
 A (British) Company, Mih-Ho-Loong Rifles
 Jewish Company
 American Company
 Portuguese Company
 Philippine Company
 Japanese Company
 Interpreter Company (Chinese)
 Shangai Russian Regiment, 'C' Battalion
 B (British) Company
 H (Reserve) Company
 Shanghai Scottish Company
 'C' Machine-Gun Company
 Light Automatic (Air Defence) Company
 Shanghai Field Company (engineers)
 Transport Company

Tientsin Area 

 Tientsin Area, Tientsin
 Headquarters, Tientsin Area commanded by Brigadier John Emilius Laurie, 6th Baronet
 Tientsin Area Signal Section, Royal Corps of Signals
 1st Battalion, The Durham Light Infantry
 A Company + Platoon, Peking
 Tientsin Area Detachment, Royal Engineers

Malaya Command 
Malaya Command covered British Malaya, British Singapore, and British Borneo.

 Malaya Command, Singapore
 Headquarters, Malaya Command commanded by Governor of the Straits Settlements Sir Thomas Shenton Whitelegge Thomas
 2nd Battalion, 17th Dogra Regiment, Taiping
 Malay Regiment
 4th Battalion, Straits Settlements Volunteer Force, Malacca
 Jahore Volunteer Force, Johor Bahru
 Sultan Idris Infantry Company
 Kedah Volunteer Force Company, Alor Setar
 Kelantan Volunteer Force Company, Kota Bharu
 Perak Rivers Infantry Platoon
 50th Company, Royal Army Service Corps
 14th Company, Royal Army Ordnance Corps
 32nd Company, Royal Army Medical Corps

Penang Fortress 

 Penang Fortress, Fort Cornwallis
 Headquarters, Penang Fortress
 Penang Fortress Signal Section, Royal Corps of Signals
 5th Battalion, 14th Punjab Regiment
 3rd Battalion, Federated Malay States Volunteer Force
 8th Heavy Battery, Hong Kong and Singapore Royal Artillery
 36th Fortress Company, Royal Engineers

Federated Malay States Volunteer Force 

 Federated Malay States Volunteer Force, Port Dickson
 Headquarters, Volunteer Forces
 Federated Malay States Volunteer Force Signal Section
 Federated Malay States Volunteer Force Armoured Car Squadron, Ipoh
 1st Battalion, Federated Malay States Volunteer Force, Ipoh
 2nd Battalion, Federated Malay States Volunteer Force, Kuala Lumpur
 3rd Battalion, Federated Malay States Volunteer Force, Seremban
 4th Battalion, Federated Malay States Volunteer Force, Kuantan
 Light Field Battery, Federated Malay States Volunteer Force, Kuala Lumpur
 Federated Malay States Volunteer Force Engineer Company

Singapore Fortress 

 Singapore Fortress, Singapore
 Headquarters, Singapore Fortress
 Malay Signal Company, Royal Corps of Signals
 7th Heavy Regiment, Royal Artillery, Blakang Mati (coastal defence)
 5th and 7th Hvy Btys, Hong Kong and Singapore Royal Artillery attached
 9th Heavy Regiment, Royal Artillery, Changi (coastal defence)
 Straits Settlements Volunteer Force Armoured Car Company
 1st Battalion, Straits Settlements Volunteer Force
 2nd Battalion, Straits Settlements Volunteer Force
 Singapore Field Battery, Straits Settlements Volunteer Force
 Singapore Field Engineer Company, Straits Settlements Volunteer Force
 Singapore Fortress Engineer Company, Straits Settlements Volunteer Force
 Malaya Infantry Brigade
 Headquarters, Malaya Inf Bde, Singapore
 2nd Battalion, The Loyal North Lancashire Regiment
 2nd Battalion, Gordon Highlanders, Changi
 1st Battalion, The Manchester Regiment (machine-gun)
 12th Indian Infantry Brigade
 Headquarters, 12th Indian Inf Bde, Singapore
 2nd Battalion, Princess Louises's Argyll and Sutherland Highlanders
 5th Battalion, 2nd Punjab Regiment
 4th Battalion, 19th Hyderabad Regiment
 22nd Mountain Regiment, Indian Artillery
 15th Field Company, Bombay Sappers and Miners
 Malaya Air Defences
 Headquarters, Malaya Air Defences, Singapore
 1st Anti-Aircraft Regiment, The Hong Kong and Singapore Artillery
 2nd Anti-Aircraft Regiment, The Hong Kong and Singapore Artillery
 3rd Anti-Aircraft Regiment, The Hong Kong and Singapore Artillery
 Singapore Fortress Royal Engineers
 Singapore Fortress Royal Engineers Headquarters, Singapore
 30th Fortress Company, Royal Engineers
 34th Fortress Company, Royal Engineers
 35th Fortress Company, Royal Engineers
 41st Fortress Company, Royal Engineers

Indian Ocean 
The Indian Ocean area covered the islands of Ceylon and Mauritius.

Ceylon 

 Ceylon Defence Force, Colombo
 Headquarters, Ceylon Defence Force commanded by Governor of Ceylon Sir Andrew Caldecott
 Ceylon Signal Section, Royal Corps of Signals
 Ceylon Mounted Rifles, Kandy
 Ceylon Planters' Rifle Corps, Kandy
 Ceylon Light Infantry
 Ceylon Cadet Battalion
 6th Heavy Regiment, Royal Artillery, Trincomalee
 14th HAA Bty attached
 Ceylon Garrison Artillery (Volunteers)
 31st Fortress Company, Royal Engineers
 Ceylon Engineer Company

Mauritius 

 British Troops on Mauritius, Port Louis
 Headquarters, British Troops on Mauritius commanded by Governor of Mauritius Sir Bede Edward Hugh Clifford
 Mauritius Signal Section, Royal Corps of Signals
 Mauritius Territorial Force, Rodrigues
 25th Heavy Battery, Royal Artillery
 43rd Fortress Company, Royal Engineers

Pacific Ocean Region 
The Pacific Ocean region comprised the areas of: Fiji, Sarawak, and the Gilbert and Ellice Islands Colony.

 Fiji
 Headquarters, Fiji Defences Forces, Suva
 Fiji Defence Force Signals
 1st Battalion, The Fiji Infantry Regiment
 Sarawak
 Sarawak Rangers
 Sarawak Armed Police
 Gilbert and Ellice Islands Colony
 Ocean Island Defence Force, Ocean Island

Royal West African Frontier Force 
The Royal West African Frontier Force or also known as the West African Force comprised troops from the areas of Colony of Nigeria, Gold Coast Protectorate, Colony of Sierra Leone, Gambia Protectorate, and the Cameroons Mandate.

 Royal West African Frontier Force Headquarters commanded by Brigadier Collen Edward Melville Richards
 Gold Coast Signal Section
 Nigerian Signal Company, Zaria
 4th Battalion, The Nigeria Regiment, Ibadan
 5th Battalion, The Nigeria Regiment, Zaria
 The Gold Coast Regiment (SR)
 The Gambia Company, Cape Saint Mary
 B Company, 3rd Battalion, The Nigeria Regiment, Victoria
 Gold Coast Defence Force
 Lagos Defence Force, Lagos
 1st Light Nigerian Field Battery, Zaria
 Light Gold Coast Field Battery, Accra
 European Reserve Force Engineer Cadre, Logos
 1st West African Infantry Brigade
 Headquarters, 1st West African Inf Bde, Kaduna
 1st Battalion, The Nigeria Regiment, Kaduna
 2nd Battalion, The Nigeria Regiment, Kano
 3rd Battalion, The Nigeria Regiment, Enugu (-B Co)
 4th Gold Coast Infantry Brigade
 Headquarters, 4th Gold Coast Inf Bde, Kumasi
 1st Battalion, The Gold Coast Regiment, Kumasi
 2nd Battalion, The Gold Coast Regiment, Tamale
 3rd (Territorial) Battalion, The Gold Coast Regiment, Winneba
 Sierra Leone Brigade
 Headquarters, Sierra Leone Bde, Freetown
 Sierra Leone Signal Section, Royal Corps of Signals
 Sierra Leone Regiment
 Sierra Leone Heavy Battery, Royal Artillery (Coastal defence)
 39th Fortress Company, Royal Engineers

East African Force 
The East African Force comprised troops, and was tasked with covering the following areas: Uganda Protectorate, Kenya Colony, Tanganyika Mandate, Northern Rhodesia Protectorate, Southern Rhodesia Colony, and Nyasaland Protectorate.

 East African Force, Nairobi
 Headquarters, East African Force commanded by Major General Douglas Povah Dickinson
 East African Signals
 1st Battalion, The Northern Rhodesia Regiment, Bwana Mkubwa
 1st Battalion, The Rhodesian Regiment, Salisbury
 2nd Battalion, The Rhodesian Regiment, Bulawayo
 7th (Uganda Territorial Force) Battalion, The King's African Rifles, Bombo
 C Company, 2nd (Kenya) Battalion, The King's African Rifles, Zomba
 Nyasaland Volunteer Reserve, Zomba
 East African Supplies and Transport Depot Company
 1st (East African) Infantry Brigade
 Headquarters, 1st East African Inf Bde, Nairobi
 Northern Area Signal Company
 3rd (Kenya) Battalion, The King's African Rifles
 4th (Uganda) Battalion, The King's African Rifles, Mombasa
 5th (Kenya) Battalion, The King's African Rifles, Meru
 1st Battalion, The Kenyan Regiment
 Coast Defence Infantry Company, King's African Rifles, Mombasa
 Kenya Defence Force
 22nd Mountain Battery, Indian Artillery (en-route)
 Southern Infantry Brigade
 Headquarters, Southern Inf Bde, Dar es Salaam
 Southern Area Signal Company
 1st (Tanganiyka Territory) Battalion, The King's African Rifles, Tabora
 2nd (Nyasaland) Battalion, The King's African Rifles, Iringa
 6th (Tanganiyka Territory) Battalion, The King's African Rifles

References

Bibliography 
 J.B.M. Frederick, Lineage Book of British Land Forces 1660-1978, Volume I, 1984: Microform Academic Publishers, Wakefield. .
 J.B.M. Frederick, Lineage Book of British Land Forces 1660-1978, Volume II, 1984: Microform Academic Publishers, Wakefield. .
 Charles D. Pettibone, The Organization and Order of Battle of Militaries in World War II, Volume II - The British Commonwealth Trafford Publishing, Victoria, Canada/Rochester, United States. 2006. .
 H. F. Joslen, Orders of Battle; Second World War 1939-1945, Reprinted in Middletown, Delaware by Permission of Her Majesty's Stationery Office, London, United Kingdom, (1960 edition), 2009, (re-printed, 2019). .
 Brigadier N.W. Routledge, History of the Royal Regiment of Artillery: Anti-Aircraft Artillery 1914–55, London: Royal Artillery Institution/Brassey's, 1994. .
 Normand E. H. Litchfield, The Territorial Artillery 1908 - 1988, 1992: The Sherwood Press, Nottingham, UK. .
.
Cliff Lord & Graham E. Watson, The Royal Corps of Signals: Unit Histories of the Corps (1920–2001) and its Antecedents, Helion & Company, Solihull, UK, 2002. .
Major General Reginald Francis Heaton Nalder, The Royal Corps of Signals: A History of its Antecedents and Development, Royal Signals Institution, London, 1955. .
 Dr. Leo Niehorster, British Army, 3 September 1939
The Monthly Army List, September 1939.
The Monthly Army List, October 1939.
 Rob Palmer, British Army Military History Website.

British Army in World War II
World War II orders of battle